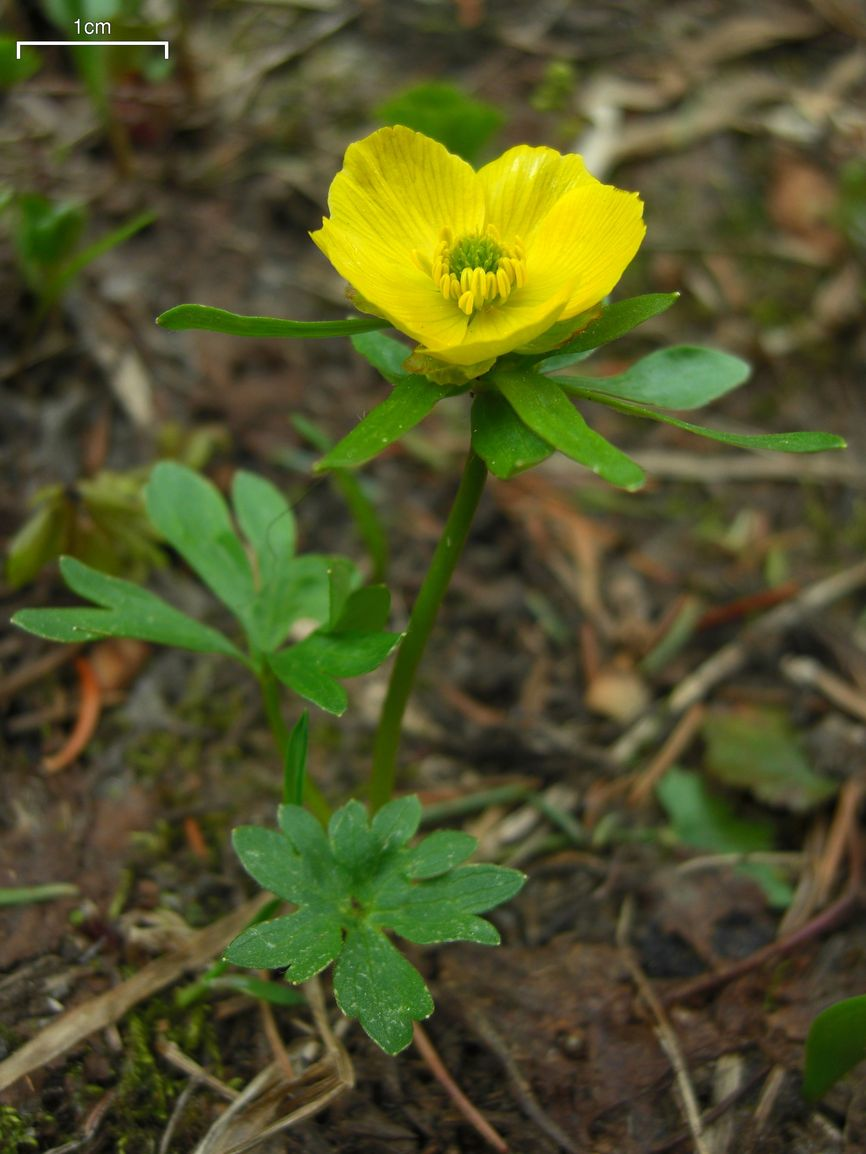
- Eschscholtz's buttercup (Ranunculus eschscholtzii)

Scientific classification
- Kingdom: Plantae
- Clade: Tracheophytes
- Clade: Angiosperms
- Clade: Eudicots
- Order: Ranunculales
- Family: Ranunculaceae
- Subfamily: Ranunculoideae
- Tribe: Ranunculeae
- Genus: Ranunculus; L.

Diversity
- About 1,700 species

Synonyms
- Aphanostemma A.St.-Hil.; Batrachium (DC.) Gray; Beckwithia Jeps.; Ceratocephala Moench.; Glossophyllum Fourr.; Kumlienia Greene; Laccopetalum Ulbr.; Myosurus L.

= Ranunculus =

Ranunculus Temporal range: Late Eocene–present

Genus of flowering plants in the buttercup family

Ranunculus (/ræ.ˈnʌŋ.kjʊ.ləs/) is a large genus of about 1750 species of flowering plants in the family Ranunculaceae. Members of the genus are known as buttercups, spearworts and water crowfoots.

The genus is distributed worldwide, primarily in temperate and montane regions. The familiar and widespread buttercup of gardens throughout Northern Europe (and introduced elsewhere) is the creeping buttercup Ranunculus repens, which has extremely tough and tenacious roots. Two other species are also widespread, the bulbous buttercup Ranunculus bulbosus and the much taller meadow buttercup Ranunculus acris. In ornamental gardens, all three are often regarded as weeds.

Buttercups usually flower in the spring, but flowers may be found throughout the summer, especially where the plants are growing as opportunistic colonizers, as in the case of garden weeds.

The water crowfoots (Ranunculus subgenus Batrachium), which grow in still or running water, are sometimes treated in a separate genus Batrachium (from Greek βάτραχος bátrakhos, "frog"). They have two different leaf types, thread-like leaves underwater and broader floating leaves. In some species, such as R. aquatilis, a third, intermediate leaf type occurs.

Ranunculus species are used as food by the larvae of some Lepidoptera species including the Hebrew character and small angle shades. Some species are popular ornamental flowers in horticulture, with many cultivars selected for large and brightly coloured flowers.

== Distribution ==
Buttercups are found in both hemispheres on all continents aside from Antarctica, and are primarily found in temperate or montane habitats. They likely originated in northern Eurasia during the late Eocene or Oligocene and rapidly radiated up to the present, dispersing worldwide. Fossil evidence suggests that despite no longer occurring there, they inhabited Antarctica up to the mid-late Pliocene, even while glaciations were rapidly altering the landscape.

=== Fossil record ===
Ranunculus gailensis and Ranunculus tanaiticus seed fossils have been described from the Pliocene Borsoni Formation in the Rhön Mountains, central Germany. Achenes labelled Ranunculus cf. tachiroei is known from the Pliocene of the Hengduan Mountains of China. Indeterminate achenes have been found from Neogene strata from the Meyer Desert Formation biota in the Transantarctic Mountains, which appear to have inhabited a periglacial environment. The oldest potential fossil is from the Late Eocene (initially identified as Miocene) Florissant Formation of Colorado, identified by Theodore Dru Alison Cockerell in 1922.

== Description ==
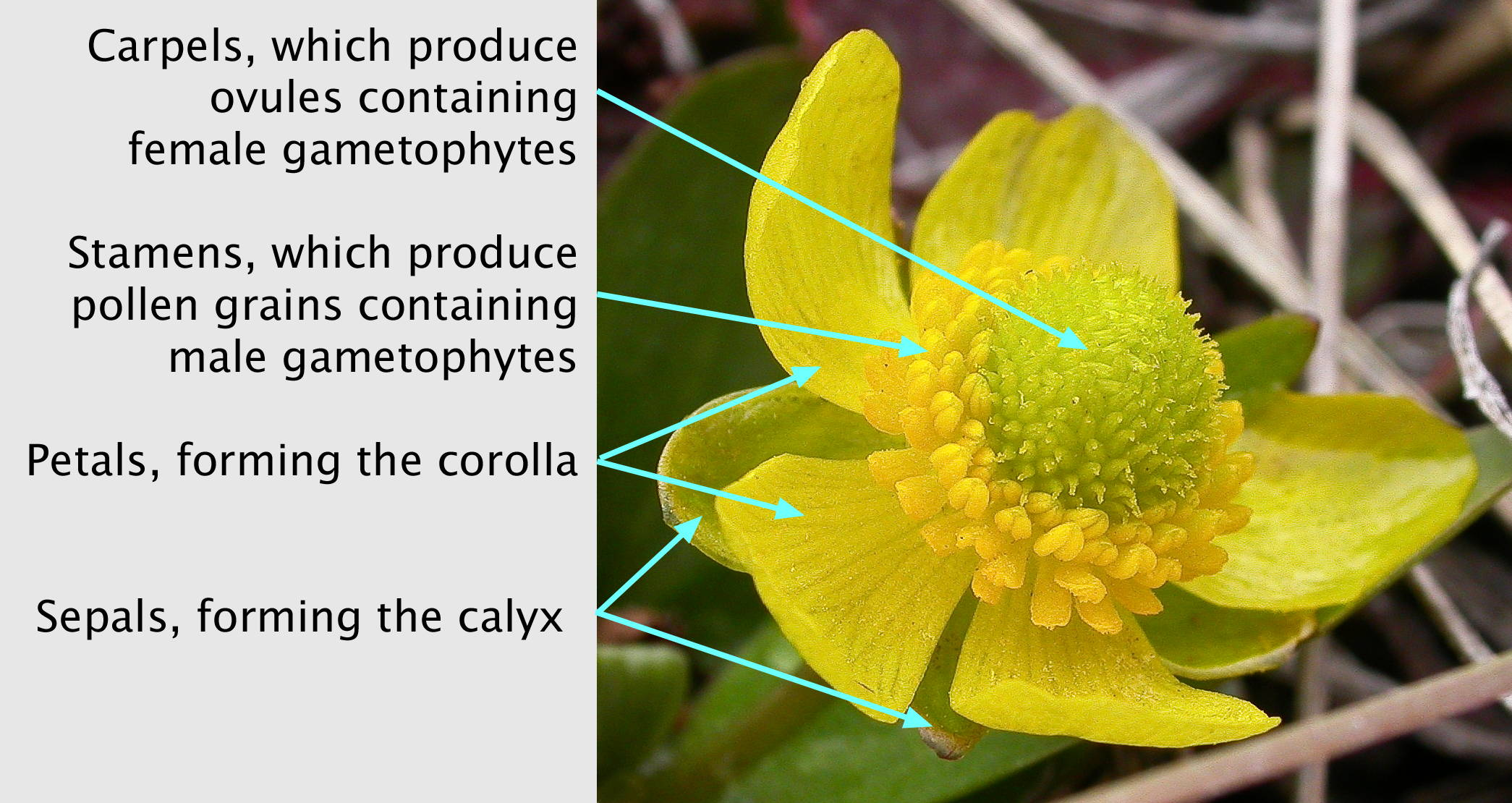
Flower of Ranunculus glaberrimus

=== Plant ===
Buttercups are mostly perennial, but occasionally annual or biennial, herbaceous, aquatic or terrestrial plants, often with leaves in a rosette at the base of the stem. In many perennial species runners are sent out that will develop new plants with roots and rosettes at the distanced nodes.

The leaves lack stipules, have petioles, are palmately veined, entire, more or less deeply incised, or compound, and leaflets or leaf segments may be very fine and linear in aquatic species.

=== Flowers ===
The hermaphrodite flowers are single or in a cyme, have usually five (but occasionally as few as three or as many as seven) sepals and usually, five yellow, greenish or white petals that are sometimes flushed with red, purple or pink (but the petals may be absent or have a different, sometimes much higher number).

At the base of each petal is usually one nectary gland that is naked or may be covered by a scale. Anthers may be few, but often many are arranged in a spiral, are yellow or sometimes white, and with yellow pollen. The sometimes few but mostly many green or yellow carpels are not fused and are also arranged in a spiral, mostly on a globe or dome-shaped receptacle.

==== Reflective petals ====
The petals of buttercups are often highly lustrous, especially in yellow species, owing to a special coloration mechanism: the petal's upper surface is very smooth causing a mirror-like reflection. The flash aids in attracting pollinating insects and temperature regulation of the flower's reproductive organs. The reflective quality of the buttercup's petals is mentioned in British folklore; if one holds a buttercup underneath their chin, the light reflecting onto the chin indicates that they like butter.

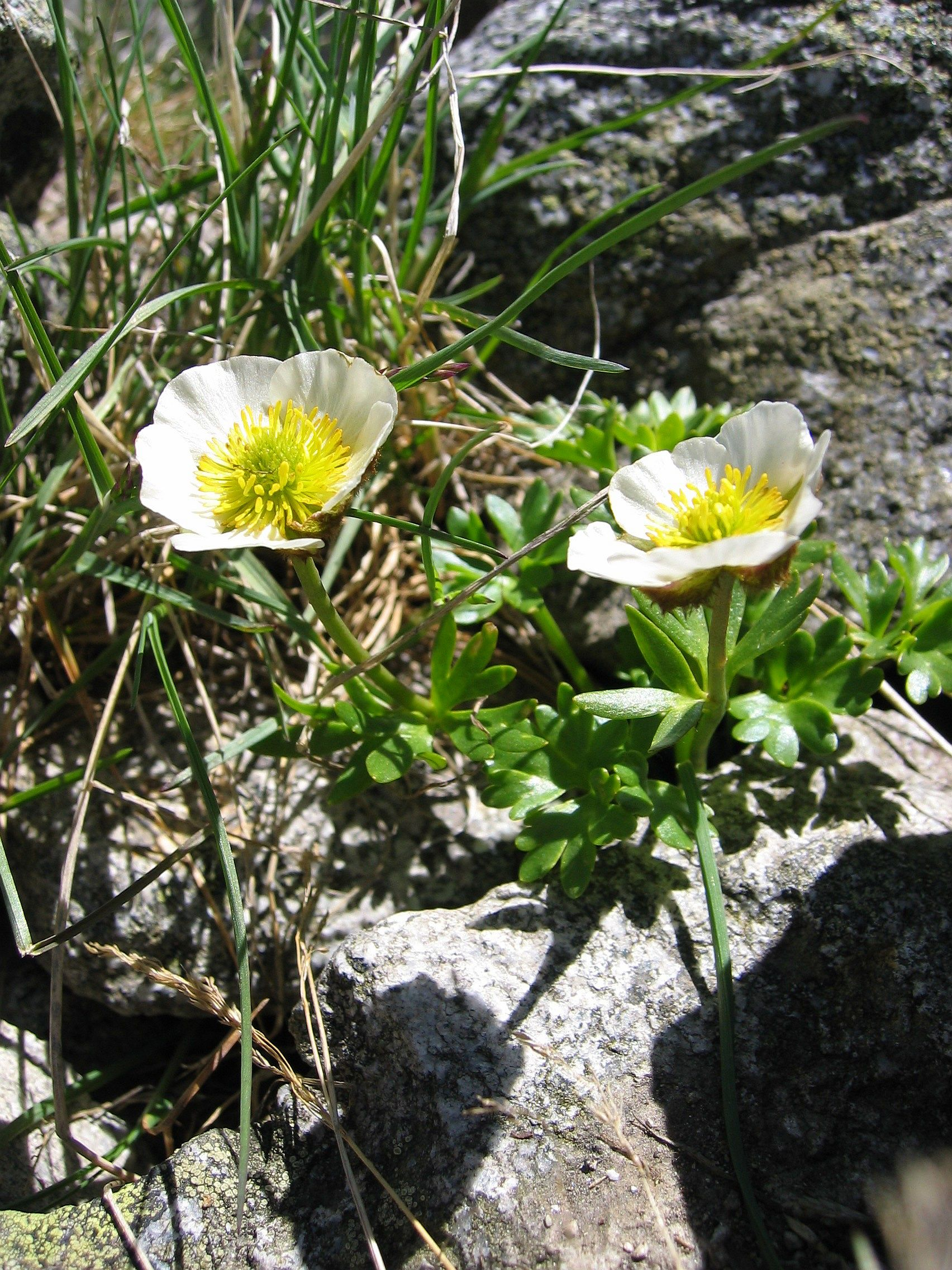
Glacier buttercup Ranunculus glacialis

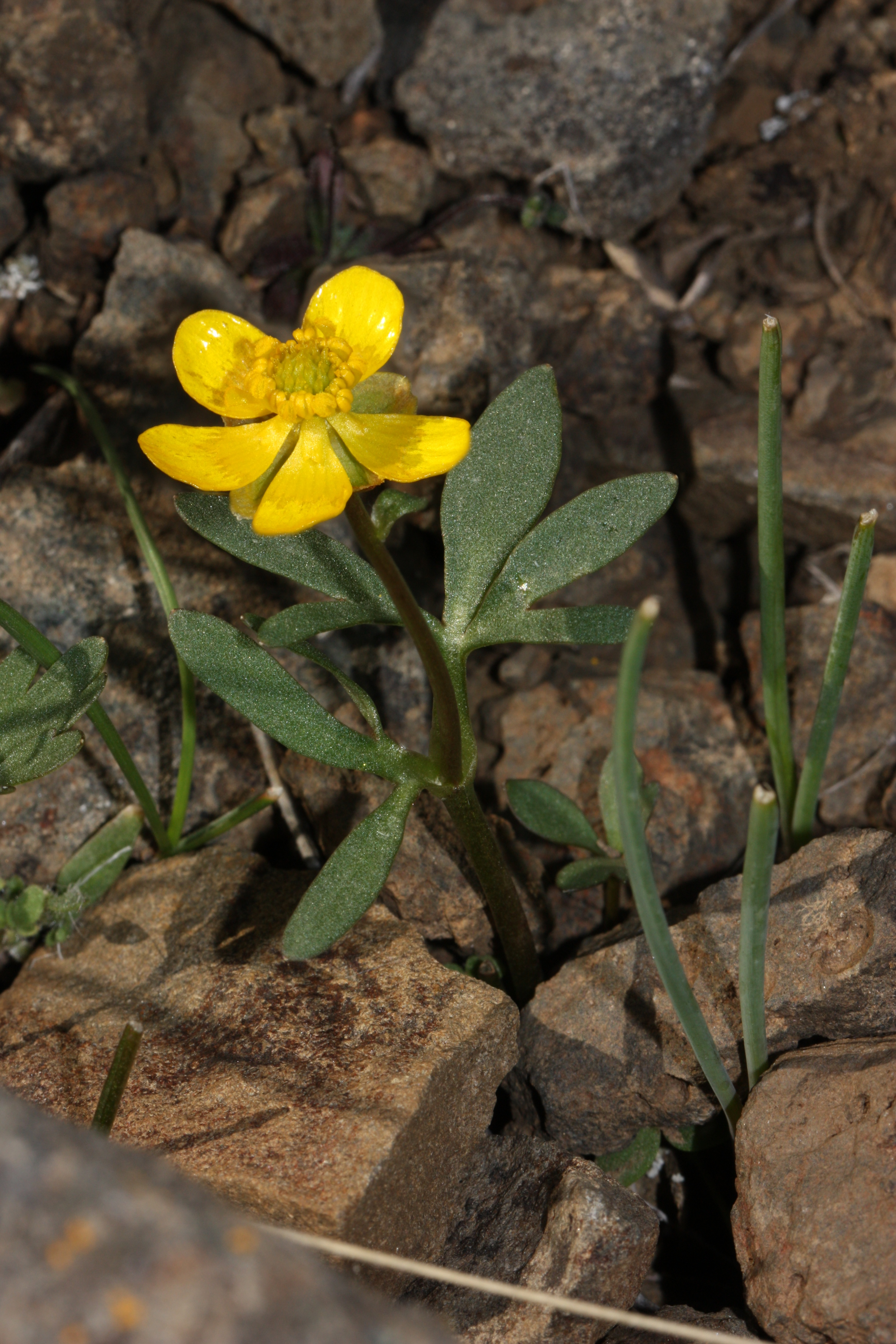
Sagebrush buttercup (Ranunculus glaberrimus)

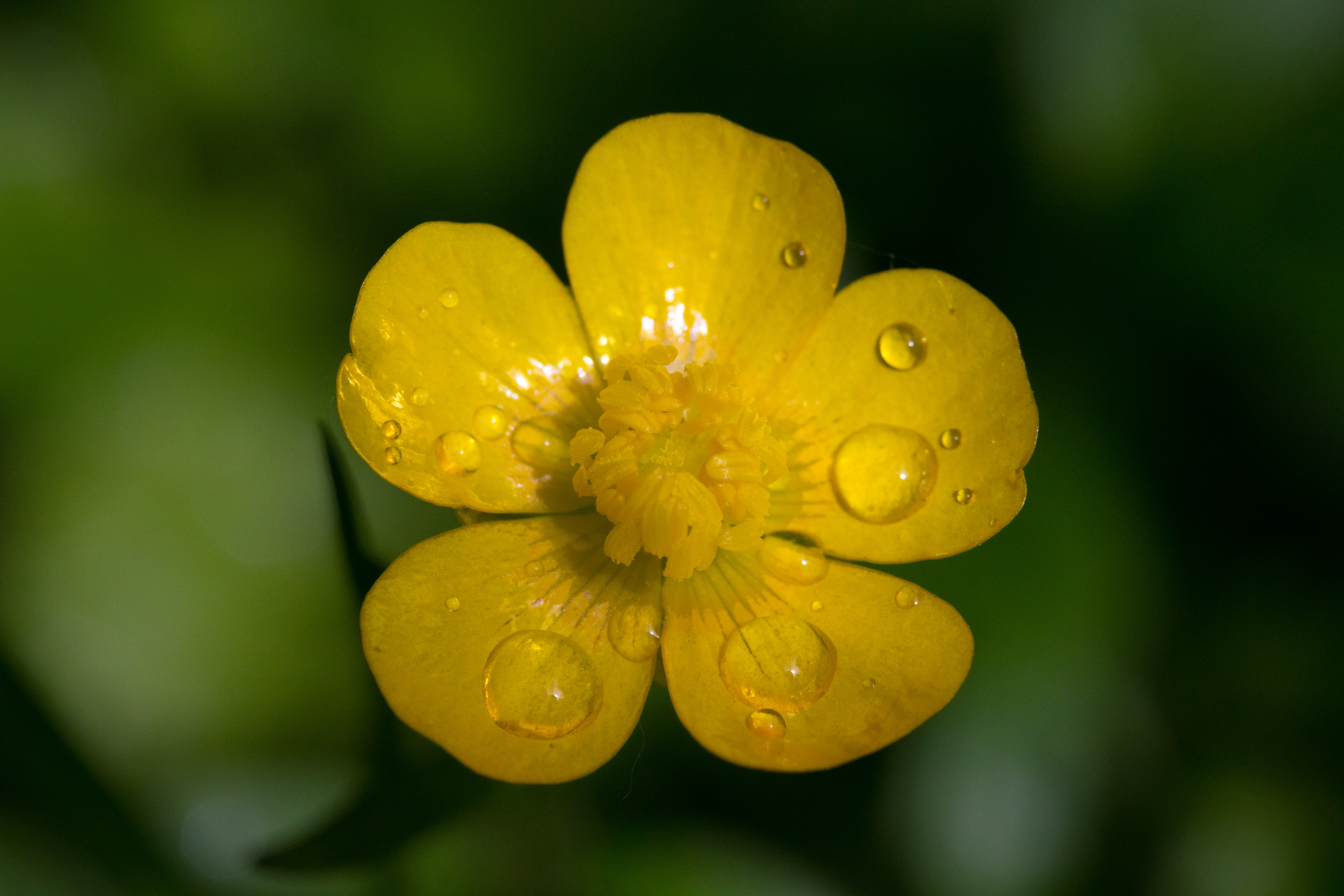
Creeping buttercup (Ranunculus repens)

Ranunculus asiaticus, a cultivated form

=== Fruit ===
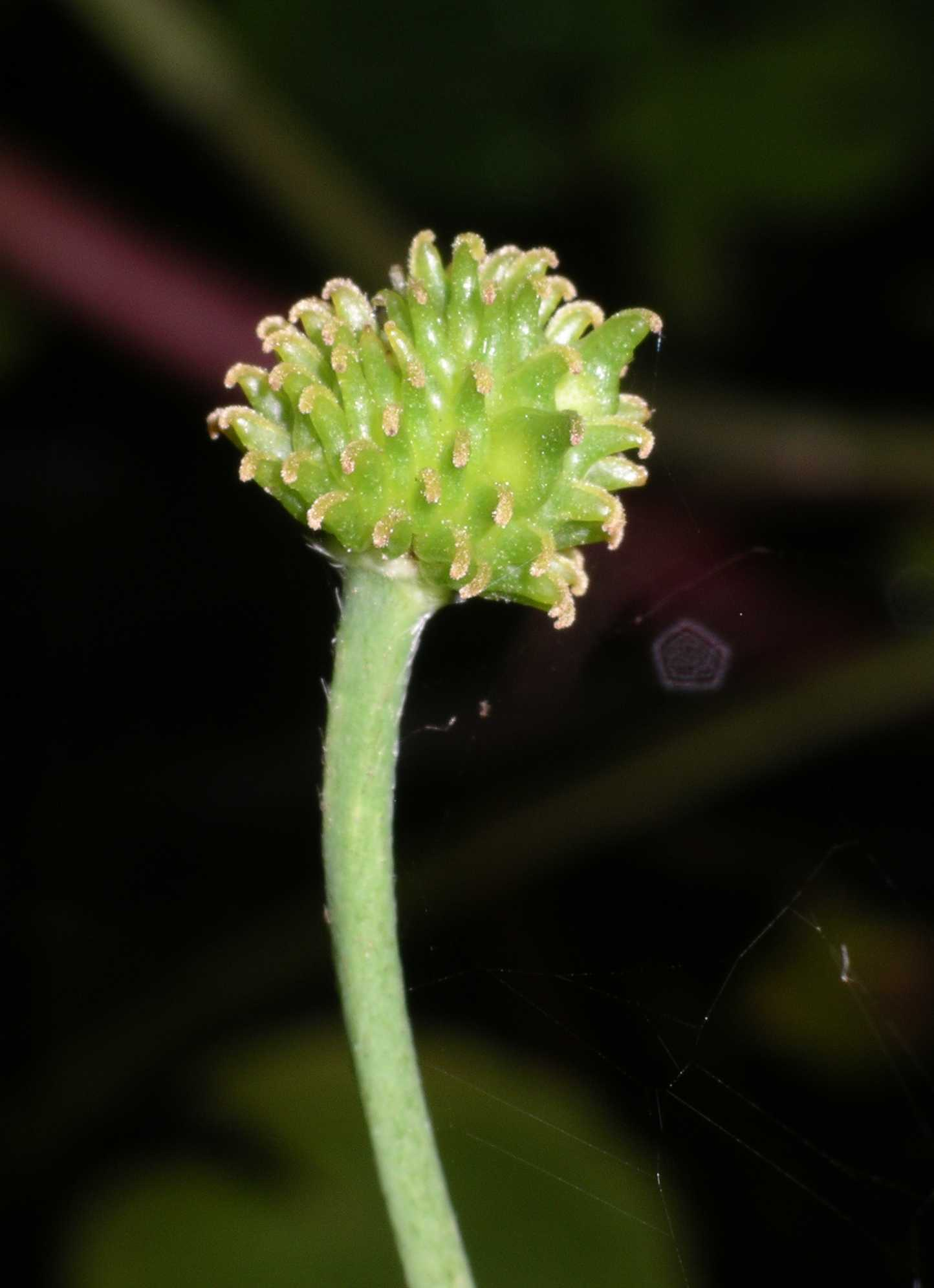
Seed head of Ranunculus showing developing achenes

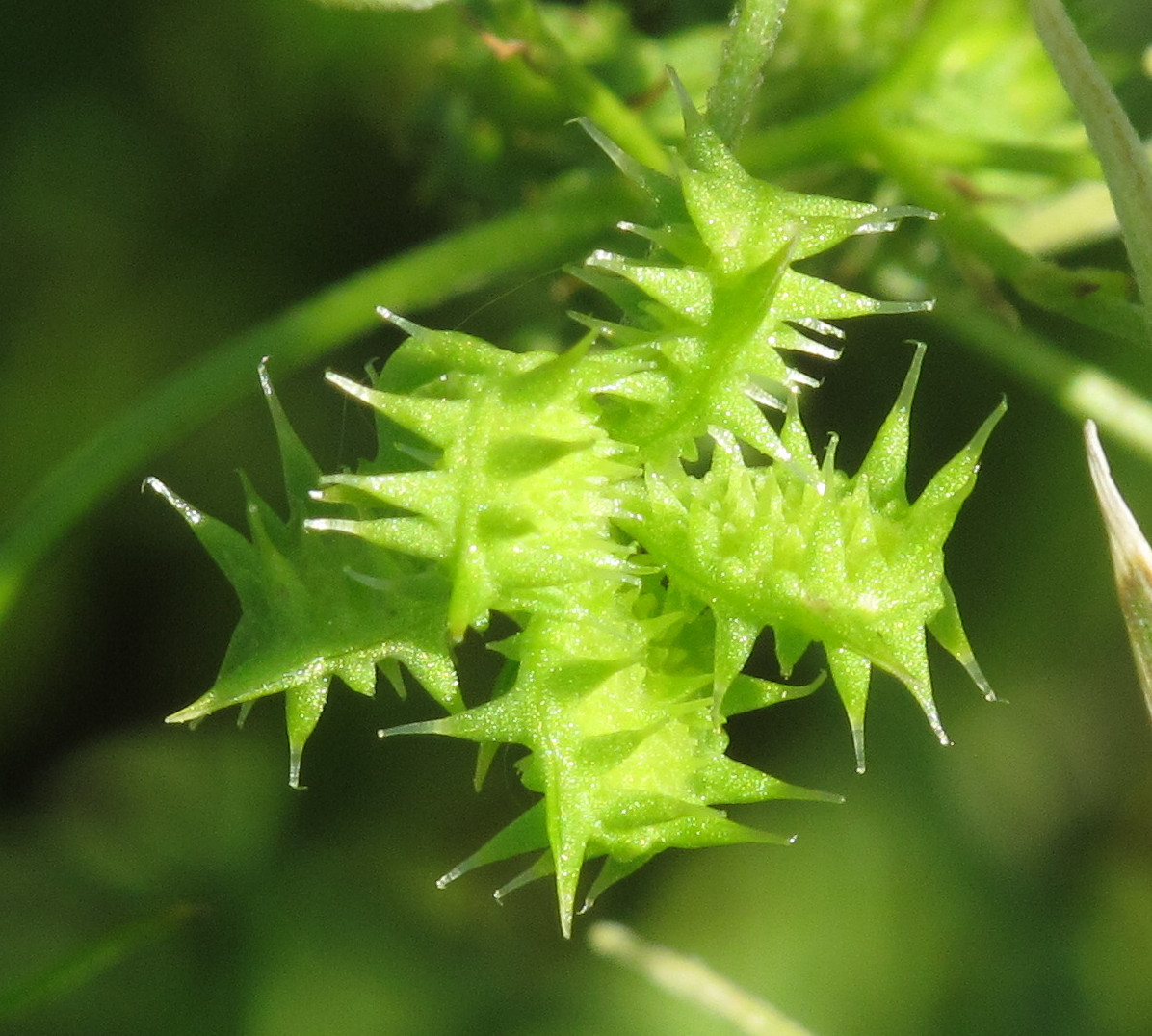
Infrutescence of Ranunculus arvensis

The fruits (in this case called achenes) may be smooth or hairy, winged, nobby or have hooked spines.

== Naming ==
The genus name Ranunculus is Late Latin for "little frog", the diminutive of rana. This probably refers to many species being found near water, like frogs.

The common name buttercup may derive from a false belief that the plants give butter its characteristic yellow hue (in fact it is poisonous to cows and other livestock). A popular children's game involves holding a buttercup up to the chin; a yellow reflection is supposed to indicate a fondness for butter. In ancient Rome, a species of buttercup was held to the skin by slaves attempting to remove forehead tattoos made by their owners.

In the interior of the Pacific Northwest of the United States, the buttercup is called "Coyote's eyes"—ʔiceyéeyenm sílu in Nez Perce and spilyaynmí áčaš in Sahaptin. In the legend, Coyote was tossing his eyes up in the air and catching them again when Eagle snatched them. Unable to see, Coyote made eyes from the buttercup.

== Splitting of the genus ==
Molecular investigation of the genus has revealed that Ranunculus is not monophyletic with respect to a number of other recognized genera in the family—e.g. Ceratocephala, Halerpestes, Hamadryas, Laccopetalum, Myosurus, Oxygraphis, Paroxygraphis and Trautvetteria. A proposal to split Ranunculus into several genera has thus been published in a 2010 classification for the tribe Ranunculeae. The split (and often re-recognized) genera include Arcteranthis Greene, Beckwithia Jeps., Callianthemoides Tamura, Coptidium (Prantl) Beurl. ex Rydb., Cyrtorhyncha Nutt. ex Torr. & A.Gray, Ficaria Guett., Krapfia DC., Kumlienia E. Greene and Peltocalathos Tamura. Not all taxonomists and users accept this splitting of the genus, and it can alternatively be treated in the broad sense.

== Pharmacological activity ==
The most common uses of Ranunculus species in traditional medicines are as an antirheumatic, as a rubefacient, and to treat intermittent fever. The findings in some Ranunculus species of, for example, protoanemonin, anemonin, may justify the uses of these species against fever, rheumatism and rubefacient in Asian traditional medicines.

== Toxicity ==
All Ranunculus (buttercup) species are poisonous when eaten fresh, but their acrid taste and the blistering of the mouth caused by their poison means they are usually left uneaten. Poisoning in livestock can occur where buttercups are abundant in overgrazed fields where little other edible plant growth is left, and the animals eat them out of desperation. Symptoms of poisoning include bloody diarrhea, excessive salivation, colic, and severe blistering of the mouth, mucous membranes and gastrointestinal tract. When Ranunculus plants are handled, naturally occurring ranunculin is broken down to form protoanemonin, which is known to cause contact dermatitis in humans and care should therefore be exercised in extensive handling of the plants. The toxins are degraded by drying, so hay containing dried buttercups is safe.

== See also ==
- List of Ranunculus species
