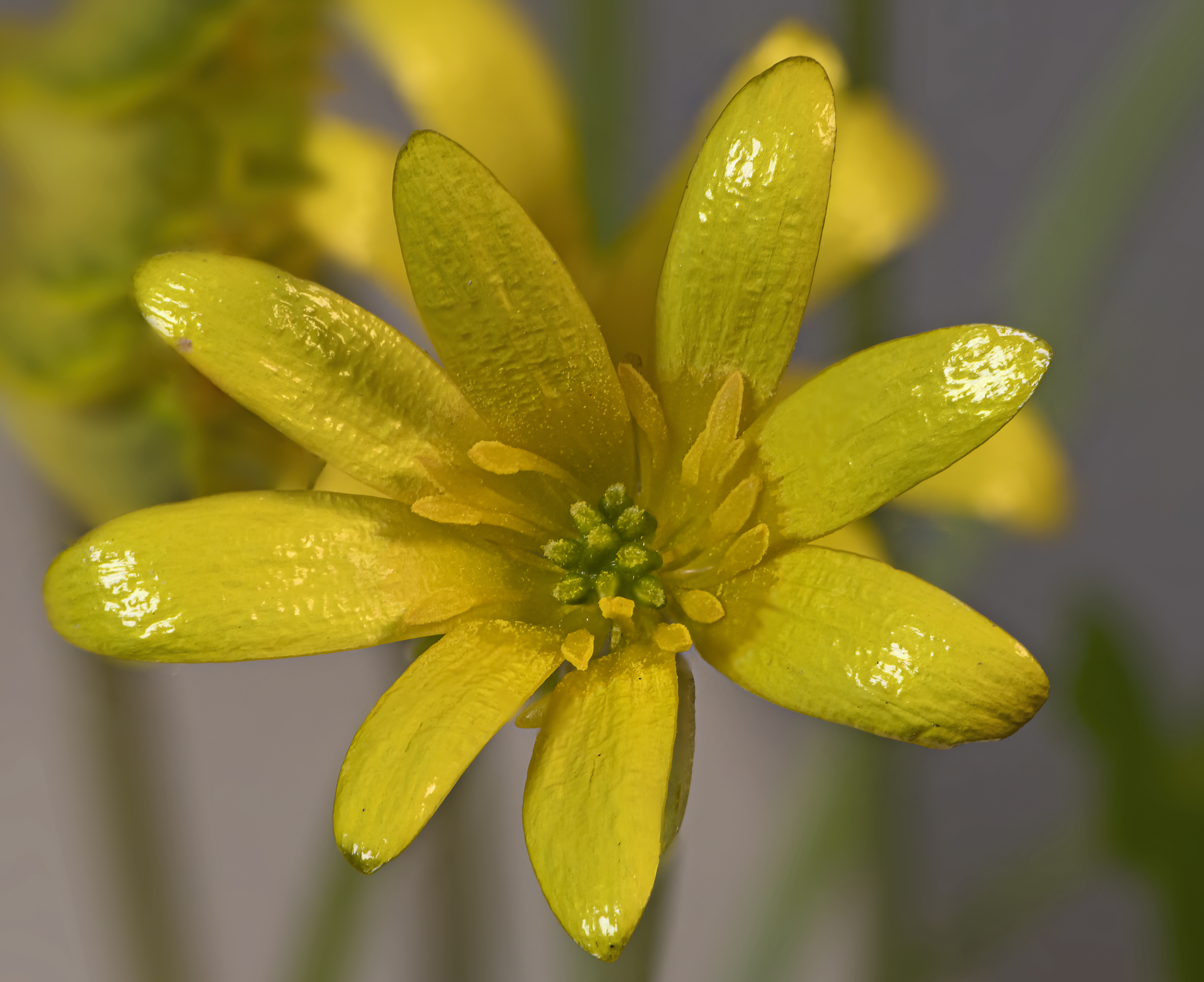
- Lesser celandine, Ficaria verna

Scientific classification
- Kingdom: Plantae
- Clade: Embryophytes
- Clade: Tracheophytes
- Clade: Angiosperms
- Clade: Eudicots
- Order: Ranunculales
- Family: Ranunculaceae
- Subfamily: Ranunculoideae
- Tribe: Ranunculeae
- Genus: Ficaria; Guett.

Species
- Ficaria fascicularis K.Koch; Ficaria ficarioides (Bory & Chaub.) Halácsy; Ficaria popovii A.P. Khokhr.; Ficaria verna Huds.

= Ficaria =

Genus of flowering plants in the buttercup family

Ficaria is a small genus of several species of plants in the family Ranunculaceae, which were previously grouped with Ranunculus. The genus includes Ficaria verna, known as fig buttercup or lesser celandine, and related species. The name "Ficaria" is Classical Latin for fig. Plants in the genus are closely related to true buttercups, but generally have only three sepals and swollen smooth achenes.

== Splitting of genus Ranunculus ==
Molecular investigation of the genus Ranunculus revealed that it was not monophyletic with respect to a number of other recognized genera in the family – e.g. Ceratocephala, Halerpestes, Hamadryas, Laccopetalum, Myosurus, Oxygraphis, Paroxygraphis and Trautvetteria. The work revealed the need to separate Ficaria from Ranunculus, and both were added to the tribe Ranunculeae.

== Toxicity ==
All Ficaria and Ranunculus species are poisonous when eaten fresh by cattle, horses, and other livestock, but their acrid taste and the blistering of the mouth caused by their poison means they are usually left uneaten. Poisoning can occur where buttercups are abundant in overgrazed fields where little other edible plant growth is left, and the animals eat them out of desperation. Symptoms include bloody diarrhea, excessive salivation, colic, and severe blistering of the mouth, mucous membranes and gastrointestinal tract. When Ranunculus plants are handled, naturally occurring ranunculin is broken down to form protoanemonin, which is known to cause contact dermatitis in humans; care should therefore be exercised in extensive handling of the plants. The toxins are degraded by drying, so hay containing dried buttercups is safe.

== Species list ==
- Ficaria fascicularis
- Ficaria ficarioides
- Ficaria popovii
- Ficaria verna – Lesser celandine
