= Megaleranthis =

Scientific classification
- Kingdom: Plantae
- Clade: Tracheophytes
- Clade: Angiosperms
- Clade: Eudicots
- Order: Ranunculales
- Family: Ranunculaceae
- Subfamily: Ranunculoideae
- Tribe: Adonideae
- Genus: Megaleranthis; Ohwi
- Species: M. saniculifolia

Binomial name
- Megaleranthis saniculifolia Ohwi

Genus of plants

Megaleranthis is a genus of flowering plants belonging to the family Ranunculaceae. The only species is Megaleranthis saniculifolia. Its native range is Korea.
