= Anemoclema =

Scientific classification
- Kingdom: Plantae
- Clade: Tracheophytes
- Clade: Angiosperms
- Clade: Eudicots
- Order: Ranunculales
- Family: Ranunculaceae
- Subfamily: Ranunculoideae
- Tribe: Anemoneae
- Genus: Anemoclema (Franch.) W.T.Wang
- Species: A. glaucifolium

Binomial name
- Anemoclema glaucifolium (Franch.) W.T.Wang

Genus of flowering plants

Anemoclema is a genus of flowering plants belonging to the family Ranunculaceae. The only species is Anemoclema glaucifolium.

Its native range is Southern Central China.
