= Adonideae =

Scientific classification
- Kingdom: Plantae
- Clade: Tracheophytes
- Clade: Angiosperms
- Clade: Eudicots
- Order: Ranunculales
- Family: Ranunculaceae
- Subfamily: Ranunculoideae
- Tribe: Adonideae; T.Duncan & Keener

Genera
- Adonis; Megaleranthis; Trollius

Tribe of flowering plants

Adonideae is an accepted tribe of the subfamily Ranunculoideae. Adonideae contains three genera, Adonis, Megaleranthis and Trollius.
