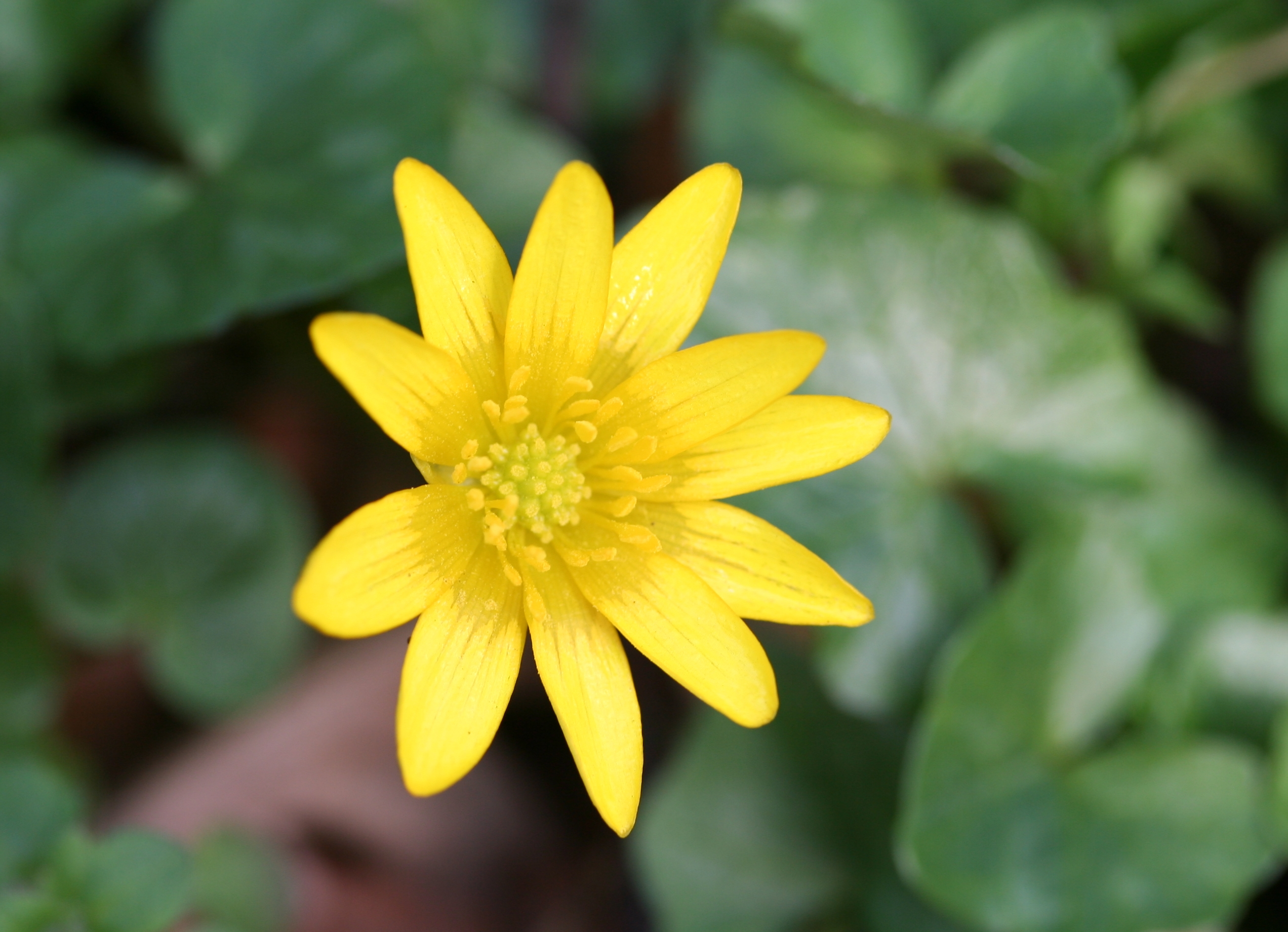
- Ranunculus ficaria

Scientific classification
- Kingdom: Plantae
- Clade: Tracheophytes
- Clade: Angiosperms
- Clade: Eudicots
- Order: Ranunculales
- Family: Ranunculaceae
- Subfamily: Ranunculoideae
- Tribe: Ranunculeae; DC.

Genera
- See text

= Ranunculeae =

Tribe of flowering plants

Ranunculeae is an accepted tribe of the subfamily Ranunculoideae. It contains several genera, with Ranunculus as the type genus.

== Genera ==
- Arcteranthis Greene
- Beckwithia Jeps.
- Callianthemoides Tamura
- Ceratocephala Moench
- Coptidium (Prantl) Á.Löve & D.Löve ex Tzvelev
- Cyrtorhyncha Nutt.
- Ficaria Guett.
- Halerpestes Greene
- Hamadryas Comm. ex Juss.
- Krapfia DC.
- Kumlienia Greene
- Laccopetalum Ulbr.
- Myosurus L.
- Oxygraphis Bunge
- Paroxygraphis W.W.Sm.
- Peltocalathos Tamura
- Ranunculus L.
- Trautvetteria Fisch. & C.A.Mey.
