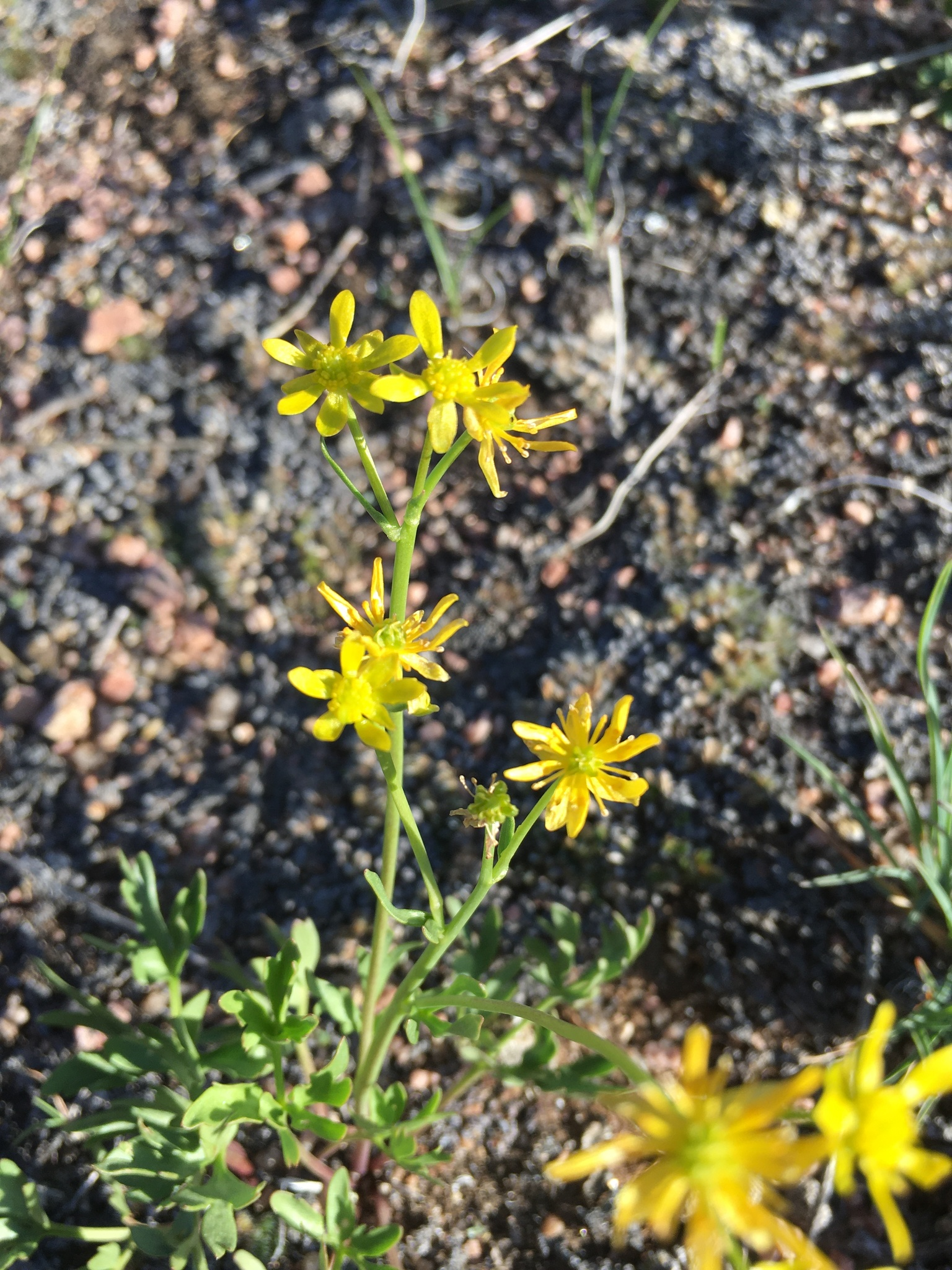

Scientific classification
- Kingdom: Plantae
- Clade: Tracheophytes
- Clade: Angiosperms
- Clade: Eudicots
- Order: Ranunculales
- Family: Ranunculaceae
- Subfamily: Ranunculoideae
- Tribe: Ranunculeae
- Genus: Cyrtorhyncha; Nutt.
- Species: C. ranunculina

Binomial name
- Cyrtorhyncha ranunculina Nutt.

= Cyrtorhyncha =

Genus of flowering plants

Cyrtorhyncha is a genus of flowering plants belonging to the family Ranunculaceae. The only species is Cyrtorhyncha ranunculina.

It is native to the United States, in the states of Colorado, New Mexico, Utah and Wyoming.
