= Arcteranthis =

Scientific classification
- Kingdom: Plantae
- Clade: Tracheophytes
- Clade: Angiosperms
- Clade: Eudicots
- Order: Ranunculales
- Family: Ranunculaceae
- Subfamily: Ranunculoideae
- Tribe: Ranunculeae
- Genus: Arcteranthis; Greene
- Species: A. cooleyae

Binomial name
- Arcteranthis cooleyae (Vasey & Rose) Greene

Synonyms
- Kumlienia cooleyae (Vasey & Rose) Greene; Ranunculus cooleyae Vasey & Rose

Genus of flowering plants

Arcteranthis is a genus of flowering plants belonging to the family Ranunculaceae. It contains a single species, Arcteranthis cooleyae. Its native range is Washington, British Columbia and Alaska.
