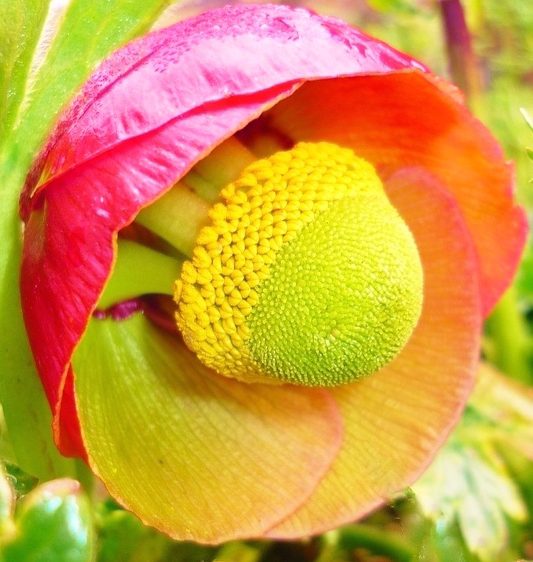
- Krapfia weberbaueri

Scientific classification
- Kingdom: Plantae
- Clade: Tracheophytes
- Clade: Angiosperms
- Clade: Eudicots
- Order: Ranunculales
- Family: Ranunculaceae
- Subfamily: Ranunculoideae
- Tribe: Ranunculeae
- Genus: Krapfia; DC.

Species
- 9, see text

= Krapfia =

Genus of flowering plants

Krapfia is a genus of plants in the family Ranunculaceae, native to the Andes.

== Species ==
Currently recognized species in Krapfia are:

- Krapfia clypeata (Ulbr.) Standl. & J.F.Macbr.
- Krapfia gigas (Lourteig) Tamura
- Krapfia grace-servatiae Trinidad & W. Mend.
- Krapfia gusmanni (Kunth) Standl. & J.F.Macbr.
- Krapfia haemantha (Ulbr.) Tamura,
- Krapfia lechleri (Schltdl.) Standl. & J.F. Macbr.
- Krapfia macropetala (DC.) Tamura
- Krapfia polystycha (Lourteig) Tamura
- Krapfia ranunculina DC.
- Krapfia weberbaueri (Ulbr.) Standl. & J.F. Macbr.
