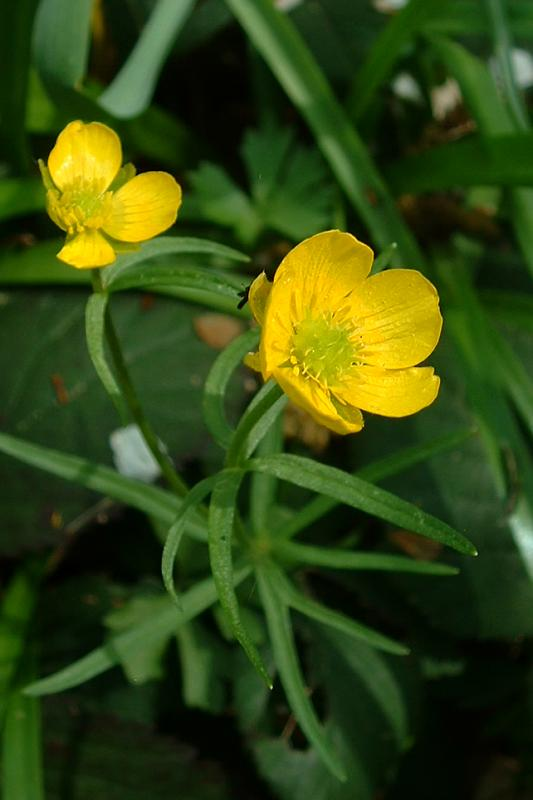
- Ranunculus auricomus

Scientific classification
- Kingdom: Plantae
- Clade: Embryophytes
- Clade: Tracheophytes
- Clade: Angiosperms
- Clade: Eudicots
- Order: Ranunculales
- Family: Ranunculaceae; Juss.

Type genus
- Ranunculus L.

Subfamilies
- Hydrastidoideae; Glaucidioideae; Coptoideae; Thalictroideae; Ranunculoideae

= Ranunculaceae =

Ranunculaceae Temporal range: 124–0 Ma Early Cretaceous–Recent

Family of eudicot flowering plants

Ranunculaceae (/rəˌnʌŋkjʊˈleɪsiˌaɪ, -si.iː/ rə-NUNG-kyuu-LAY-see-e(y)e; from Latin rānunculus 'little frog', from rāna 'frog'), commonly called the buttercup family, is a large family of flowering plants, whose range is distributed worldwide.

As of February 2026, World Flora Online accepted 53 genera and over 3,700 species. The largest genera are Ranunculus with more than 1,600 species, Delphinium with more than 500, and Clematis with almost 400.

== Description ==
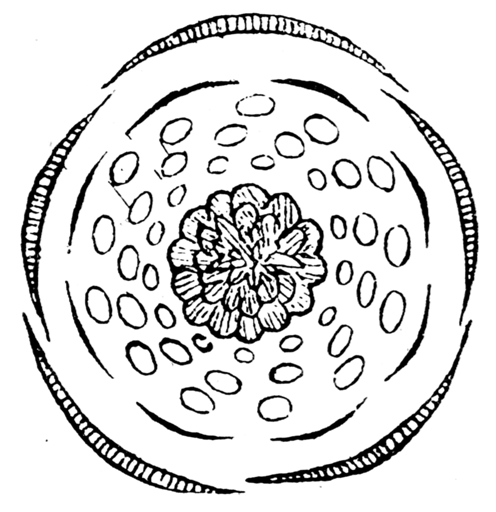
Floral diagram. Adonis annua

Ranunculaceae are mostly herbaceous annuals or perennials, but some are woody climbers (such as Clematis) or shrubs (e.g. Xanthorhiza).

Most members of the family have bisexual flowers which can be showy or inconspicuous. Flowers are solitary, but are also found aggregated in cymes, panicles, or spikes. The flowers are usually radially symmetrical but are also found to be bilaterally symmetrical in the genera Aconitum and Delphinium. The sepals, petals, stamens and carpels are all generally free (not fused), the outer flower segments typically number four or five. The outer stamens (Note: In the Ranunculaceae, a variety of terms are used to describe the whorl of structures between the sepals and stamens, including honey-leaves, petals, staminodes or nectaries) may be modified to produce only nectar, as in Aquilegia, Helleborus and Delphinium.

In some genera, such as Thalictrum, the sepals are colorful and appear petal-like (petaloid) and the petals can be inconspicuous or absent. The stems are unarmed. The leaves are variable. Most species have both basal and cauline (stem) leaves, which are usually compound or lobed but can be simple. They are typically alternate, or occasionally opposite or even whorled. Many species, especially the perennials, form rhizomes that develop new roots each year. Ficaria verna can reproduce vegetatively by means of root tubers produced in the leaf axils. Some members of the genus Thalictrum utilize anemophily while others utilize entomophily. Flowers of the entomophilous genus Papaver, also of the Ranunculales order, produce only pollen. Until recently, it was believed that the species of the genus Anemone also lack nectar.

The fruits are most commonly free, unfused achenes (e.g. Ranunculus, Clematis) or follicles (e.g. Helleborus, Eranthis, Nigella), but a berry in Actaea.

Fruit Morphology

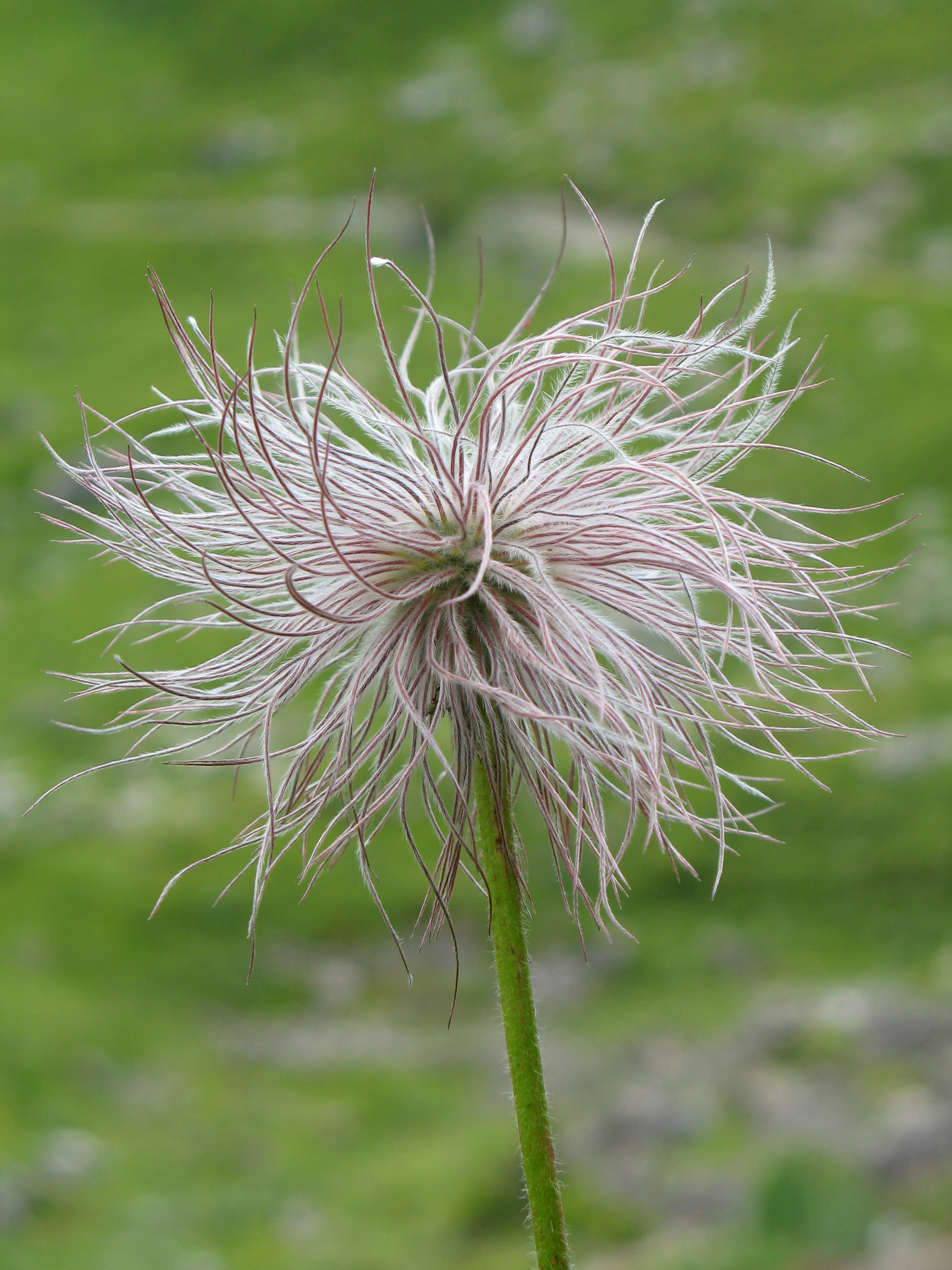
Achene: Pulsatilla alpina

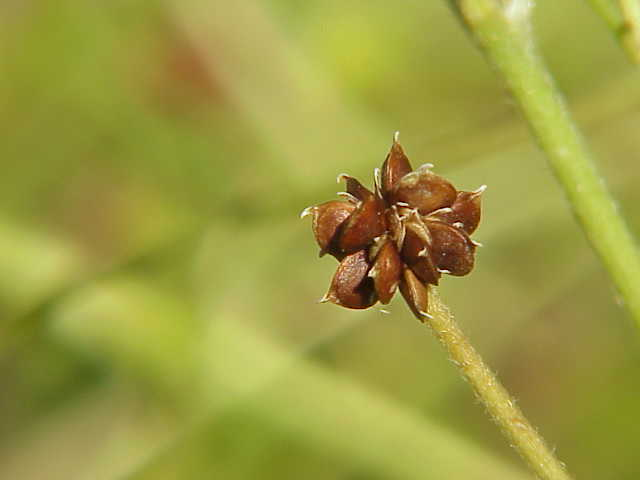
Achene: Ranunculus acris

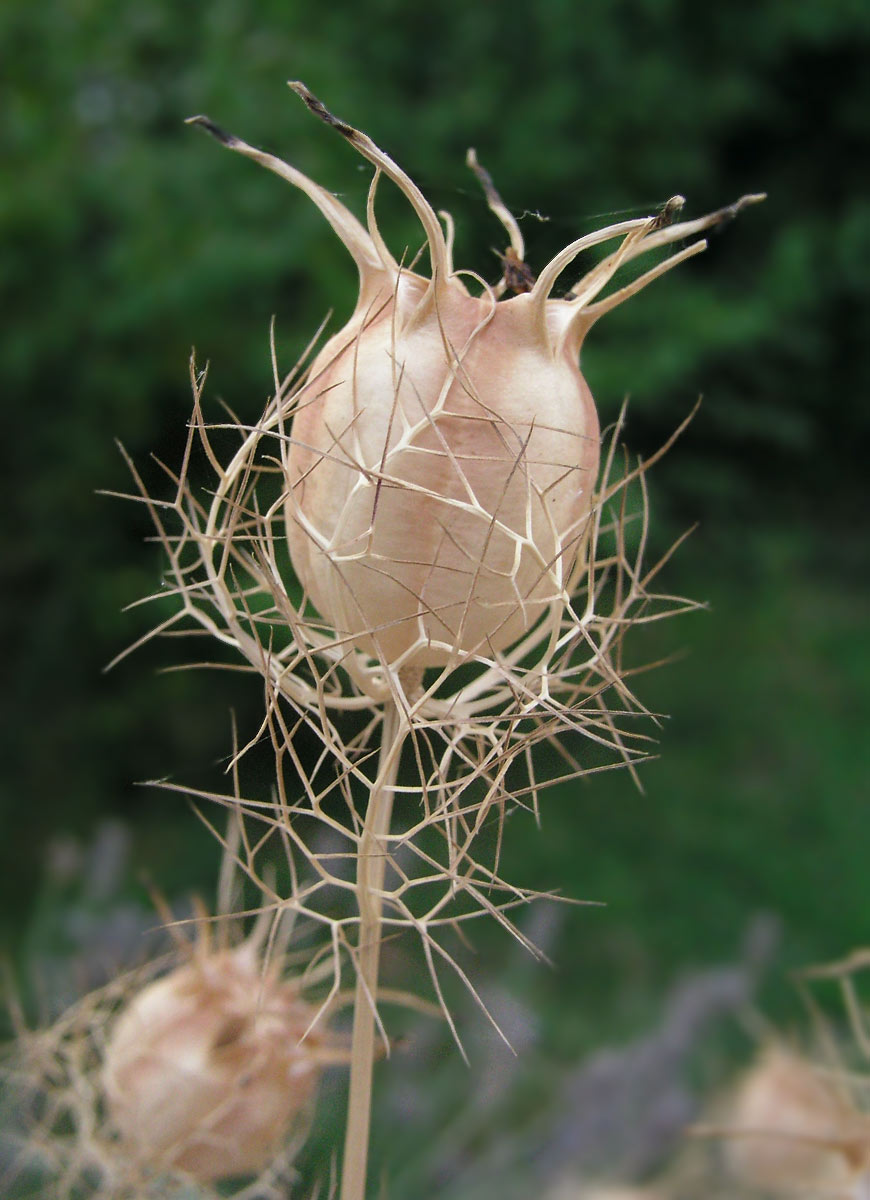
Follicle: Nigella arvensis

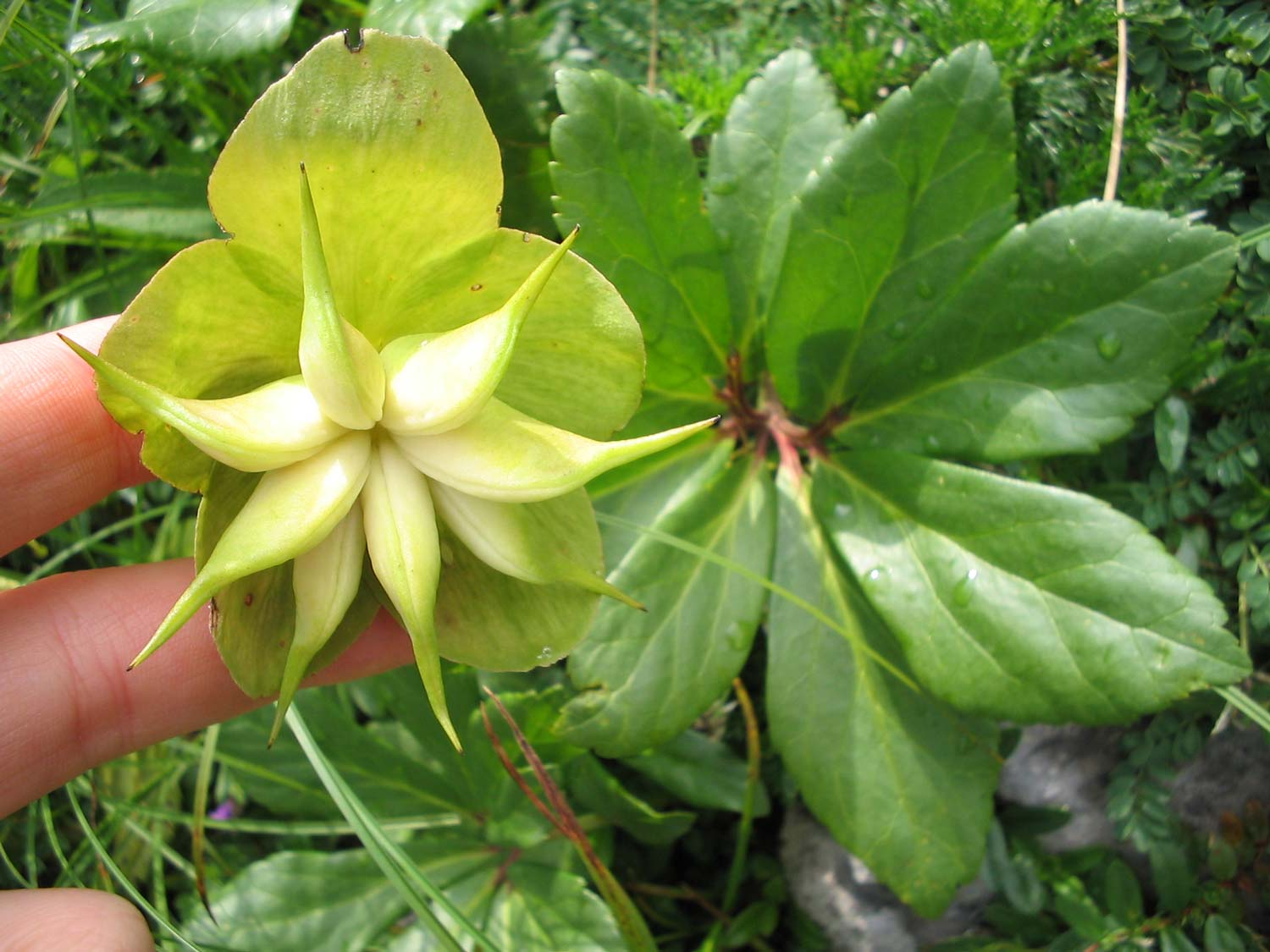
Follicle: Helleborus niger

=== Phytochemistry ===
Many Ranunculaceae members contain protoanemonin, which is toxic to humans and animals. Contact with plant sap may cause inflammation and blistering of the skin, while ingestion can cause irritation of the mouth, vomiting, and diarrhea. Toxic alkaloids such as aconitine may also be present in some species such as Aconitum carmichaelii.

== Taxonomy ==
Takhtajan (1997) included the Ranunculaceae as the only family in the Ranunculales which he placed in a subclass, the Ranunculidae, instead of a superorder. Previously, Thorn (1992) placed the Ranunculaceae in the Berberidales, an order within the Superorder Magnolianae. Earlier Cronquist in 1981 included the Ranunculaceae along with seven other families in the Rancunculales which was included in the Magnoliidae, which he regarded as a subclass. David, (2010) placed the Ranuculaceae, together with the Eupteleaceae, Lardizabalaceae, Menispermaceae, Berberidaceae, and Papaveraceae in the Ranunculales, the only order in the superorder Ranunculanae. This follows the work of the Angiosperm Phylogeny Group.

The family Ranunculaceae sensu stricto is one of seven families included in the order Ranunculales within the eudicots according to the Angiosperm Phylogeny Group (APG) classification. The family is monophyletic with Glaucidium as sister to the remaining genera. This phylogeny is illustrated in the APG Poster.

=== Subdivision ===
Early subdivisions of the family, such as Michel Adanson (1763), simply divided it based on one-seeded or many-seeded fruit. Prantl (1887) envisaged three tribes, Paeonieae, Helleboreae and Anemoneae with Paeonia, Glaucidium and Hydrastis forming Paeonieae. By the twentieth century Langlet (1932) used chromosome types to create two subfamilies, Ranunculoideae and Thalictroideae. In 1966, Tamura further developed Langlet's system by adding floral characteristics with six subfamilies:

- Helleboroideae
- Ranunculoideae
- Isopyroideae
- Thalictroideae
- Coptidoideae
- Hydrastidoideae

However, by 1988 he had reduced Coptidoideae to a tribe within Isopyroideae, leaving five subfamilies, an arrangement he continued in his 1993 monograph, dividing the larger subfamilies into tribes, although by then Paeonia and Glaucidium were no longer considered to belong to Ranunculaceae. Paeonia was separated from Ranuculaceae and placed in its own family of Paeoniaceae (order Saxifragales). Other genera originally included in Ranunculaceae include Circaeaster, which was placed in its own family Circaeasteraceae.

Tamura's complete system was structured as follows;

Subfamilies and tribes

- Subfamily Ranunculoideae Hutch.
  - Adonideae Kunth
  - Anemoneae DC.
  - Ranunculeae DC.
- Subfamily Helleboroideae Hutch.
  - Helleboreae DC.
  - Cimicifugeae Torrey & A.Gray
  - Delphineae Schrödinger
  - Nigelleae Schrödinger
- Subfamily Isopyroideae Tamura
  - Coptideae Langlet ex Tamura & K.Kosuge
  - Dichocarpeae Tamura & K.Kosuge
  - Isopyreae Schrödinger
- Subfamily Thalictroideae
- Subfamily Hydrastidoideae

The genus Glaucidium, having been moved to its own family (Glaucidiaceae), has since been restored to Ranuculaceae.

=== Molecular phylogenetics ===
When subjected to molecular phylogenetic analysis, only Thalictroideae is monophyletic. The position of Glaucidium and some of its unique morphological characteristics prompted Stevens to suggest that it be given subfamilial rank as the monotypic Glaucidioideae. Similarly, Hydrastis has been assigned to subfamily Hydrastidoideae. Both genera are represented by a single species, Glaucidium palmatum and Hydrastis canadense respectively.

The relationships between the genera suggest the existence of three major clades corresponding to Coptidoideae, Thalictroideae (clade A) and Ranunculoideae (clade F). The latter is the largest with four subclades (B–E). Of these, C corresponds to Delphineae, D to Cimicifugae and E to Ranunculoideae. Consequently, Wang and colleagues (2009) proposed a new classification with five subfamilies, and further subdividing Ranunculoideae into ten tribes. The relationship between the subfamilies is shown in the cladogram

In addition to the two monotypic subgenera, Coptoideae has 17 species and Thalictroideae has 450, including Thalictrum and Aquilegia. The other genera (2025 species, 81% of the family) belong to Ranunculoideae. Kingdonia had been included by Tamura in Anemoneae, but is now added to Circaeasteraceae.

In recent years, researchers have used nuclear genes (obtained through transcriptome sequencing technology) to further investigate the phylogenetic relationships of the Ranunculaceae family, and their findings are consistent with those of Wang and colleagues (2009). However, this study indicates that the ancestors of the Ranunculaceae family experienced multiple whole-genome duplication (WGD) events, which may be related to the longstanding prosperity of this ancient group.

Subfamilies of Ranunculaceae (5) and tribes of Ranunculoideae

- Glaucidioideae (Tamura) Loconte (1)
- Hydrastidoideae Engler (1)
- Coptidoideae Tamura (2)
- Thalictroideae Raf. (10)
- Ranunculoideae Arn. (46)
  - Adonideae Kunth
  - Delphinieae Schröd.
  - Nigelleae Schröd.
  - Helleboreae DC.
  - Cimicifugeae Torr. and A.Gray
  - Caltheae Bercht. and J.Presl
  - Asteropyreae W.T.Wang and C. Y.Chang
  - Callianthemeae W.Wang and Z. D.Chen
  - Anemoneae DC.
  - Ranunculeae DC.

Cladogram of Ranunculaceae subfamilies

- Ranunculaceae
  - Glaucidoideae
  - - Hydrastidoideae
    - - Coptidoideae
      - - Ranunculoideae
        - Thalictroideae

=== Genera ===
Ranunculaceae contains approximately 43 genera.

Subfamily Glaucidioideae

- Glaucidium Siebold & Zuccarini

Subfamily Hydrastidoideae

- Hydrastis L.

Subfamily Coptidoideae

- Coptis Salisb.
- Xanthorhiza Marshall

Subfamily Thalictroideae

- Aquilegia L.
- Dichocarpum W.T.Wang & P.K.Hsiao
- Enemion Rafinesque
- Isopyrum L.
- Leptopyrum Reichenbach
- Paraquilegia J.R.Drumm. & Hutch.
- Semiaquilegia Makino
- Thalictrum L.
- Urophysa Ulbr.

Subfamily Ranunculoideae

Tribe Adonideae

- Adonis L.
- Calathodes Hook.f. & Thomson
- Megaleranthis Ohwi
- Trollius L.

Tribe Delphinieae

- Aconitum L.
- Consolida Gray
- Gymnaconitum (Stapf) Wei Wang & Z.D.Chen
- Delphinium L.
- Staphisagria Hill

Tribe Nigelleae

- Nigella L.

Tribe Helleboreae

- Helleborus L.

Tribe Cimicifugeae

- Actaea L.
- Anemonopsis Siebold & Zuccarini
- Beesia Balf.f. & W.W.Sm.
- Cimicifuga Wernisch.
- Eranthis Salisb.

Tribe Caltheae

- Caltha L.

Tribe Asteropyreae

- Asteropyrum J.R.Drumm. & Hutch.

Tribe Callianthemeae

- Callianthemum C.A.Mey.

Tribe Anemoneae

- Anemoclema(Franch.) W.T.Wang
- AnemonastrumHolub
- Anemone L.
- Anemonoides Mill.
- Clematis L.
- Eriocapitella Nakai
- Hepatica Mill.
- Knowltonia Salisb.
- Metanemone W.T.Wang
- Naravelia Adans.
- Pulsatilla Mill.

Tribe Ranunculeae

- Arcteranthis Greene
- Beckwithia Jeps.
- Callianthemoides Tamura
- Ceratocephala Moench
- Coptidium (Prantl) Á.Löve & D.Löve ex Tzvelev
- Cyrtorhyncha Nutt.
- Ficaria Guett.
- Halerpestes Greene
- Hamadryas Comm. ex Juss.
- Krapfia DC.
- Kumlienia Greene
- Laccopetalum Ulbr.
- Myosurus L.
- Oxygraphis Bunge
- Paroxygraphis W.W.Sm.
- Peltocalathos Tamura
- Ranunculus L.
- Trautvetteria Fisch. & C.A.Mey.

Previous genera

- Anemonella Spach → Thalictrum
- Psychrophila (DC.) Bercht. & J.Presl → Caltha

=== Fossil record ===
Contrary to earlier data, there are no confirmed pre-Tertiary ranunculacean fossils. The Early Cretaceous Leefructus mirus from the Yixian Formation in China was described as belonging to the "compare Family stem lineage to the Ranunculaceae". The oldest confirmed representative of the family is Paleoactaea nagelii Pigg & DeVore described on the basis of fruits coming from the Upper Paleocene of North Dakota.

== Uses ==
More than 30 species of Ranunculaceae are used in traditional medicines, including Aconitum napellus, Actaea racemosa, Clematis recta, Clematis virginiana, Hydrastis canadensis, Ranunculus bulbosus, Helleborus niger, Delphinium staphisagria, Pulsatilla nigricans. Many genera are commonly grown in flower gardens, such as Aconitum (monkshood), Clematis, Aquilegia, Consolida (larkspur), Delphinium, Helleborus (Christmas rose), Trollius (globeflower). The seeds of Nigella sativa are used as a spice in Indian and Middle Eastern cuisine.

== Gallery ==
=== Tribes of subfamily Ranunculoideae ===
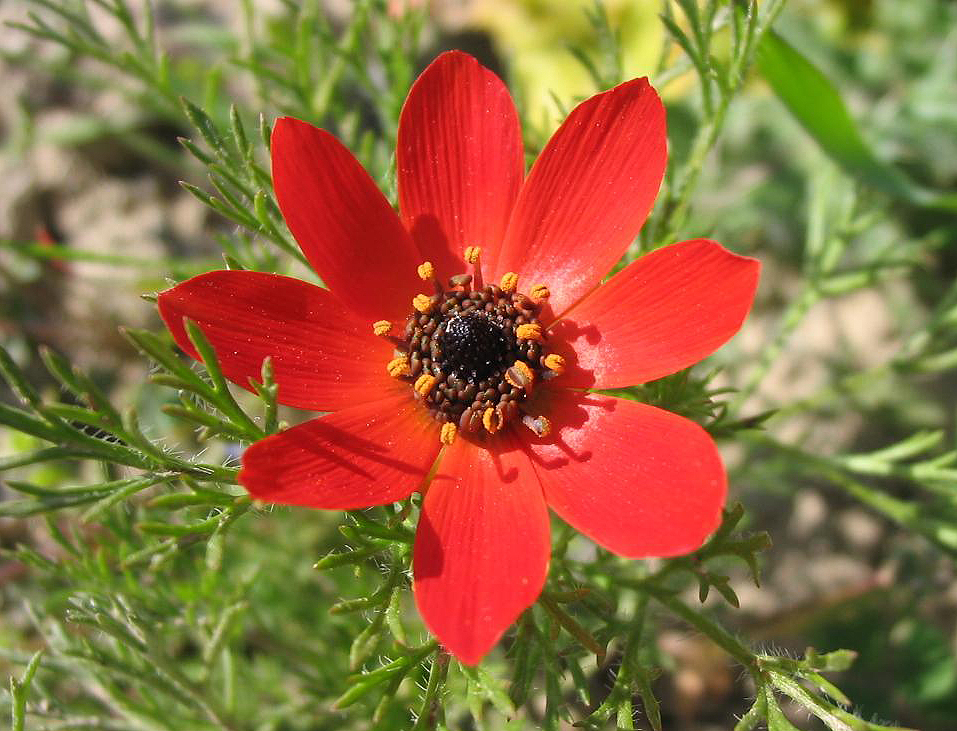
Adonideae:
Adonis annua

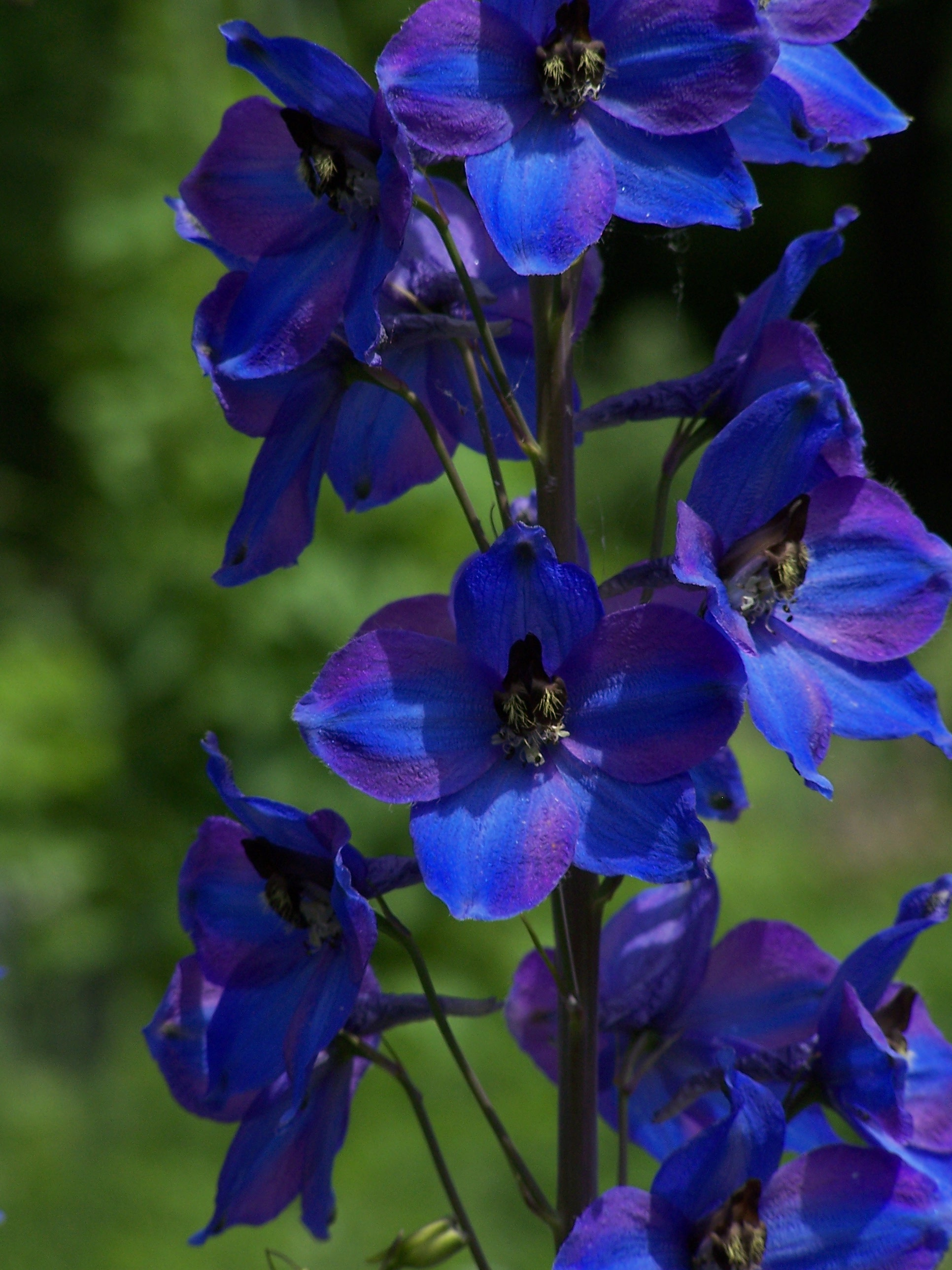
Delphinieae:
Delphinium elatum hybrid

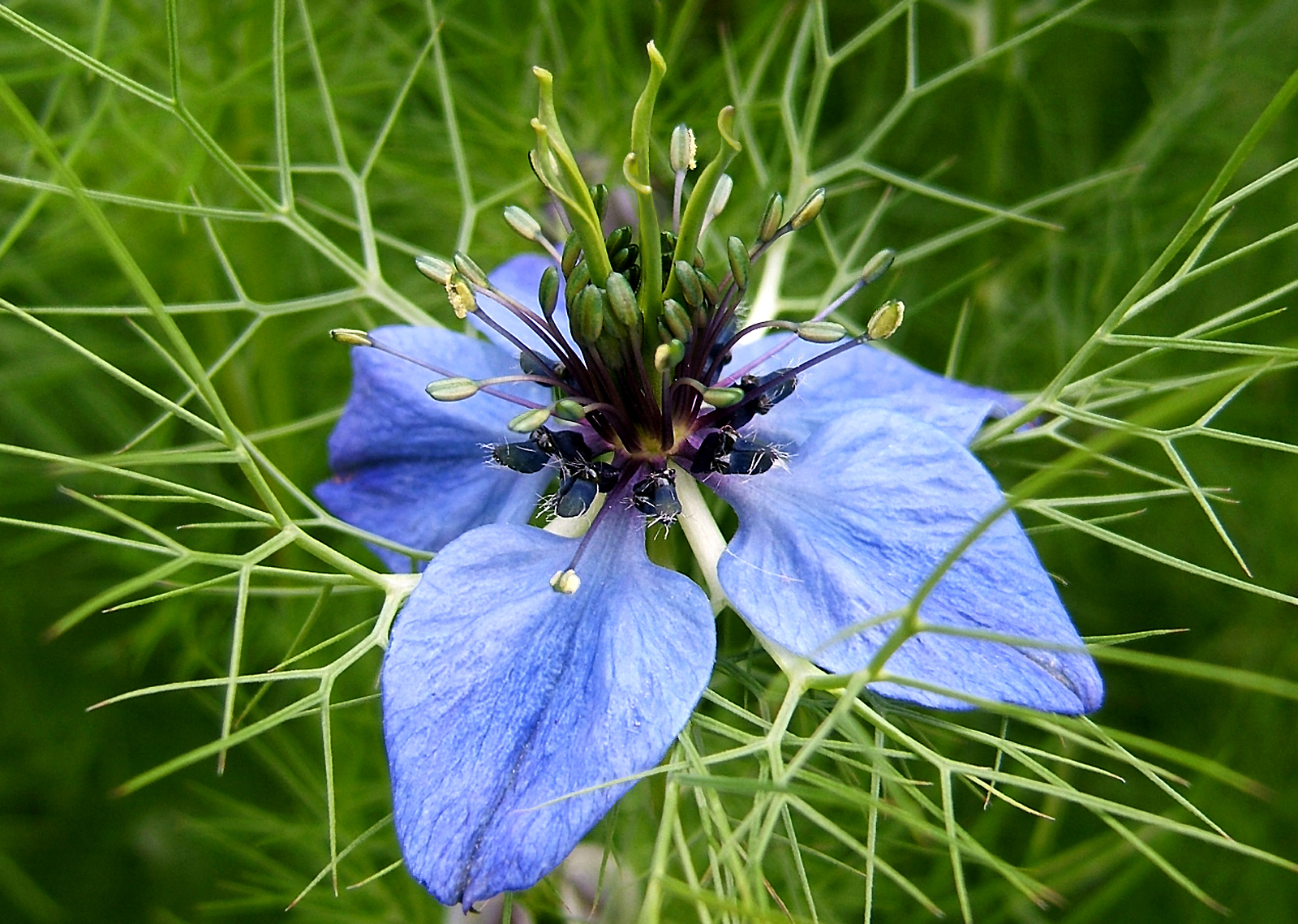
Nigelleae:
Nigella damascena

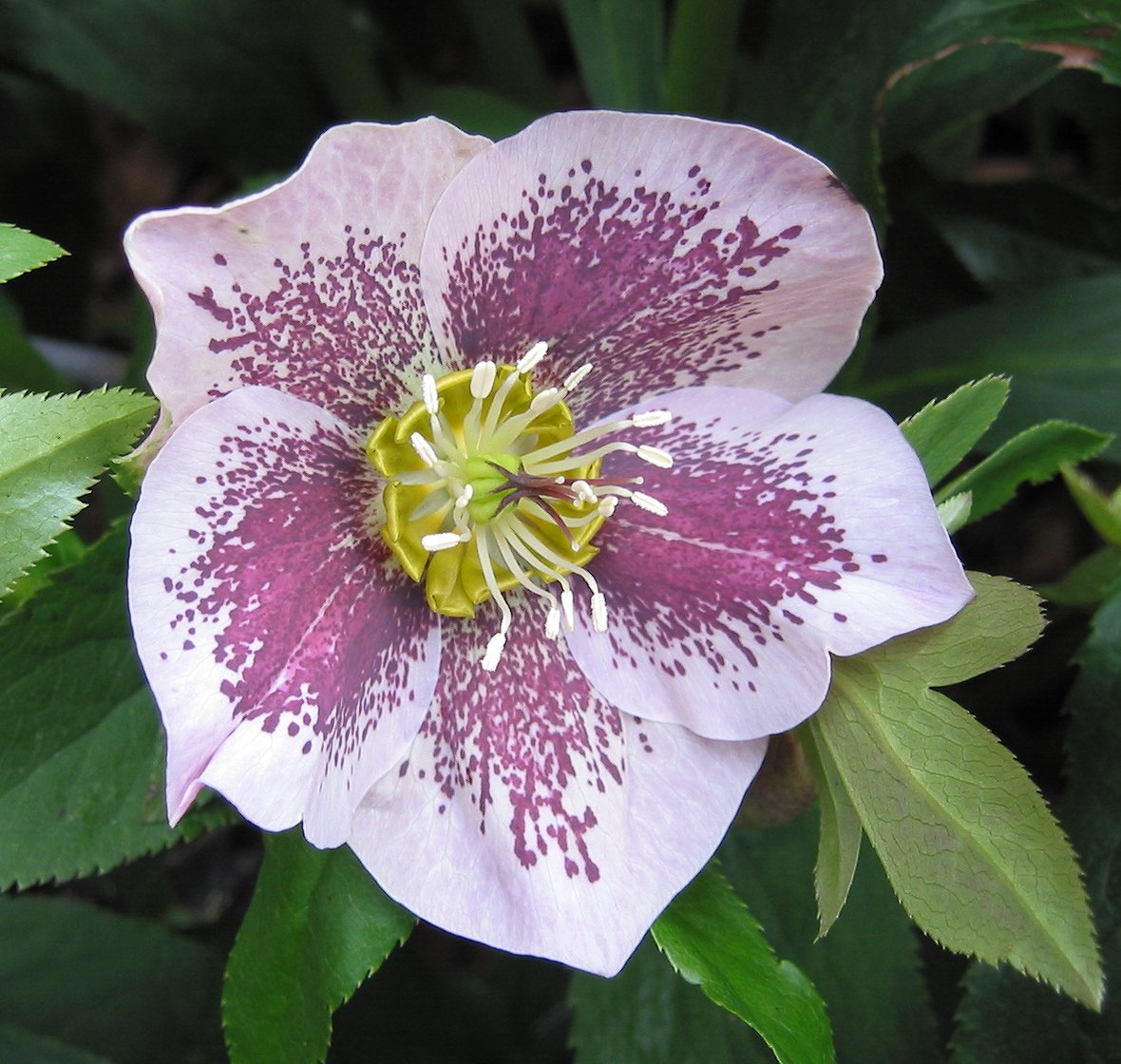
Helleboreae:
Helleborus × hybridus

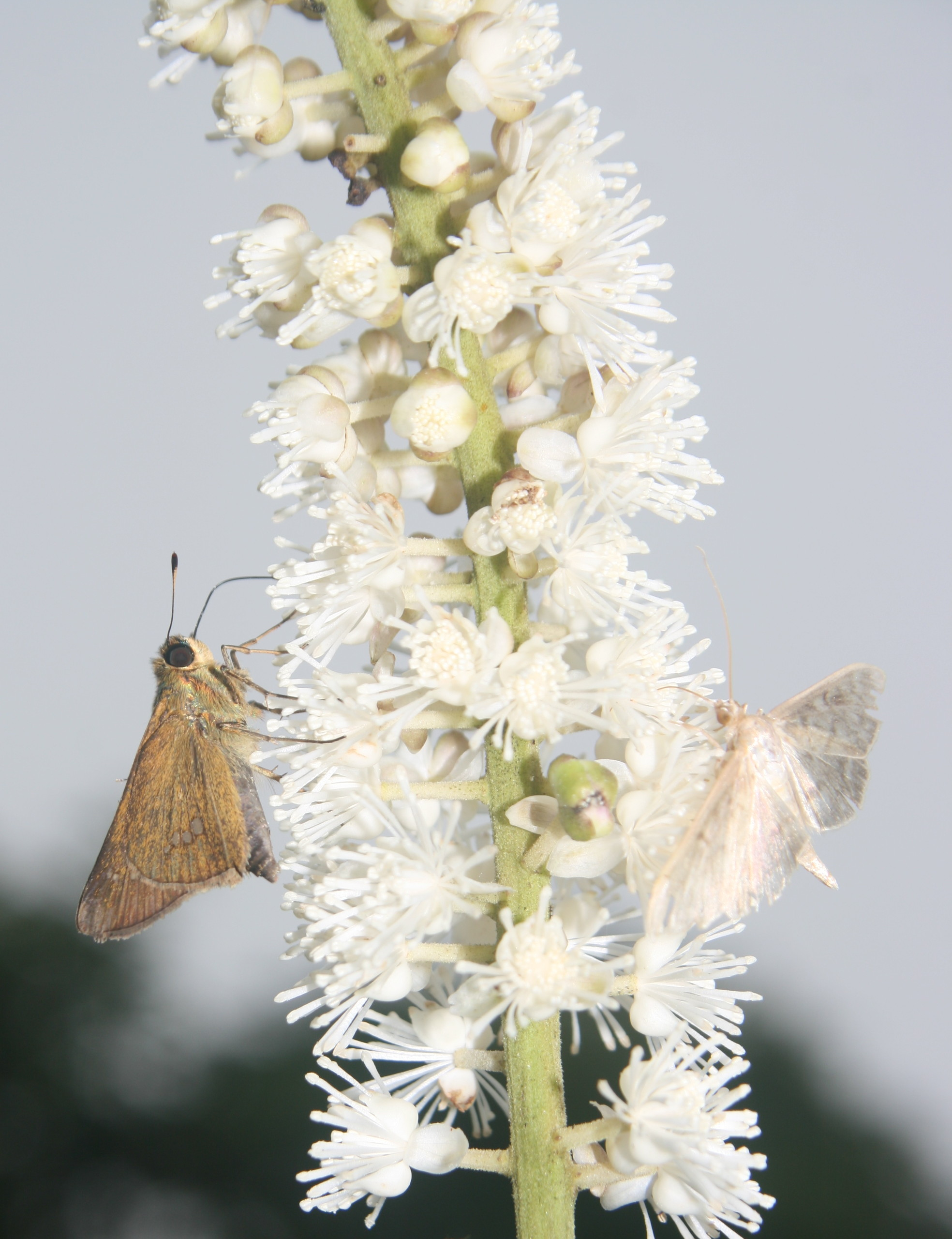
Cimicifugeae:
Actaea simplex

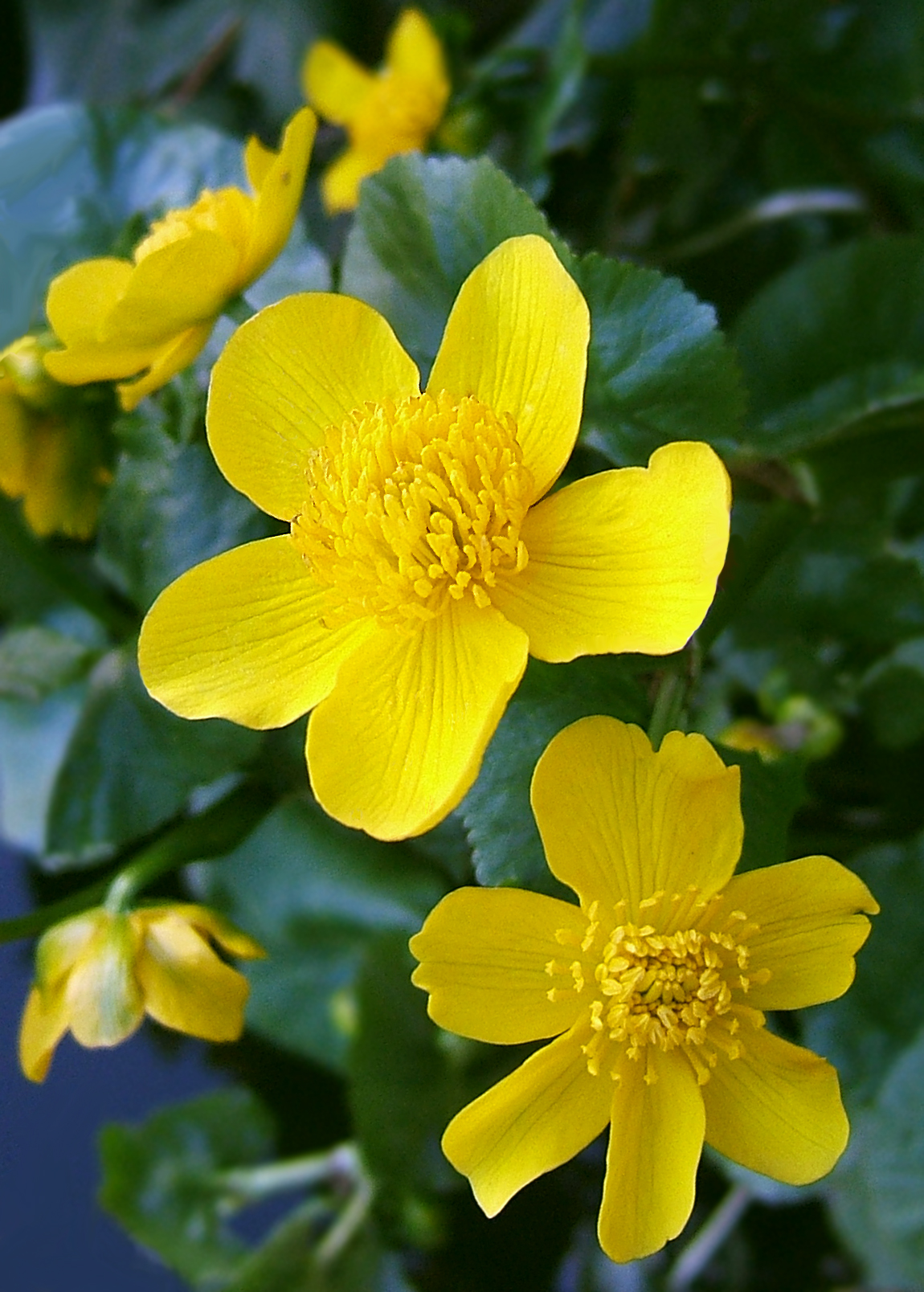
Caltheae:
Caltha palustris

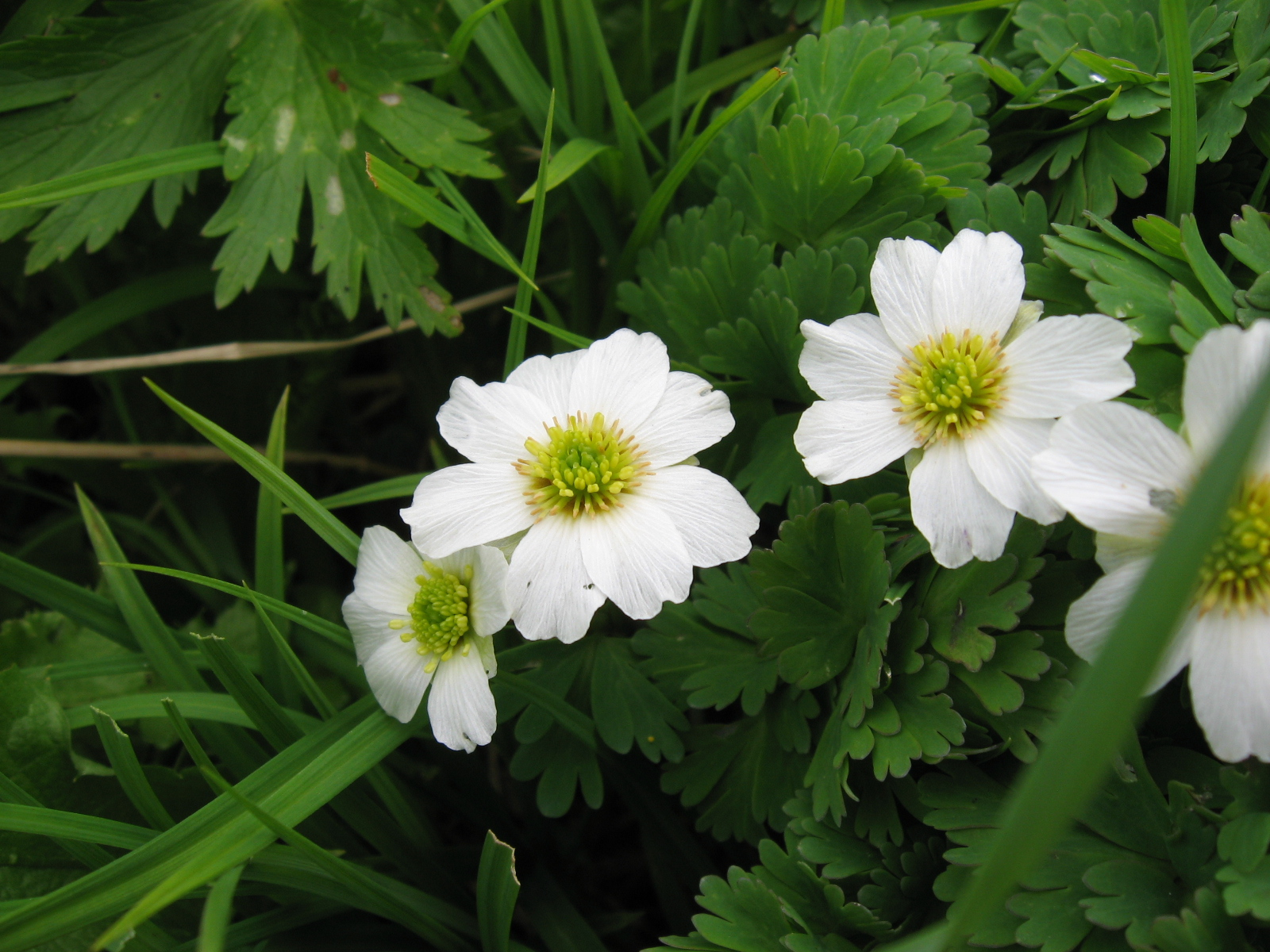
Callianthemeae:
Callianthemum hondoense

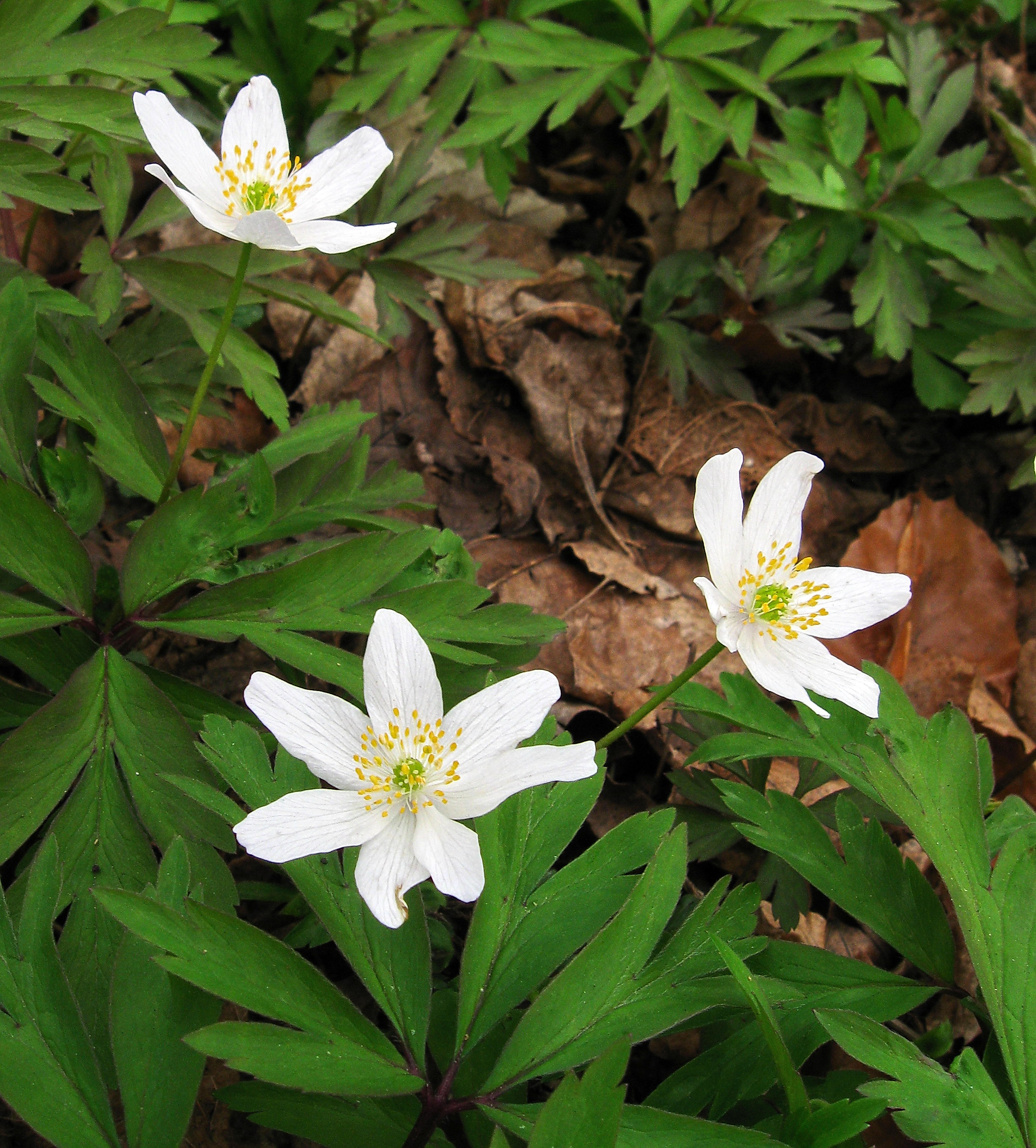
Anemoneae:
Anemone nemorosa

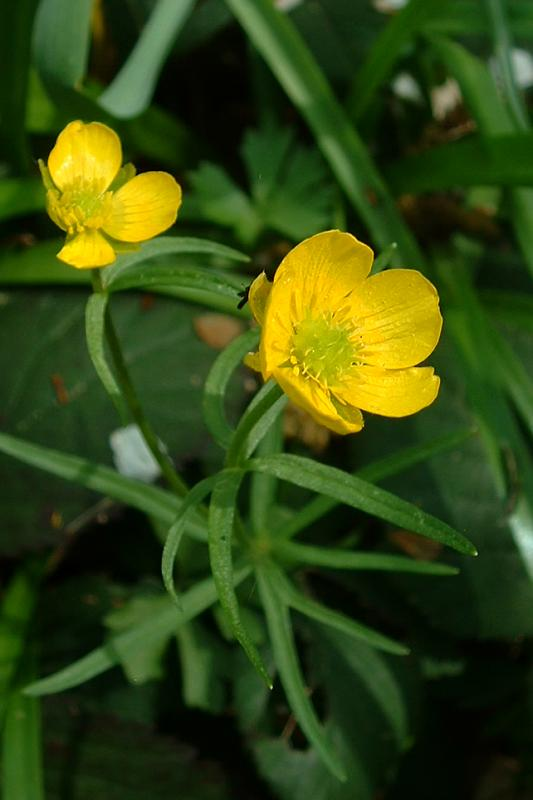
Ranunculeae:
Ranunculus auricomus

=== Other subfamilies ===
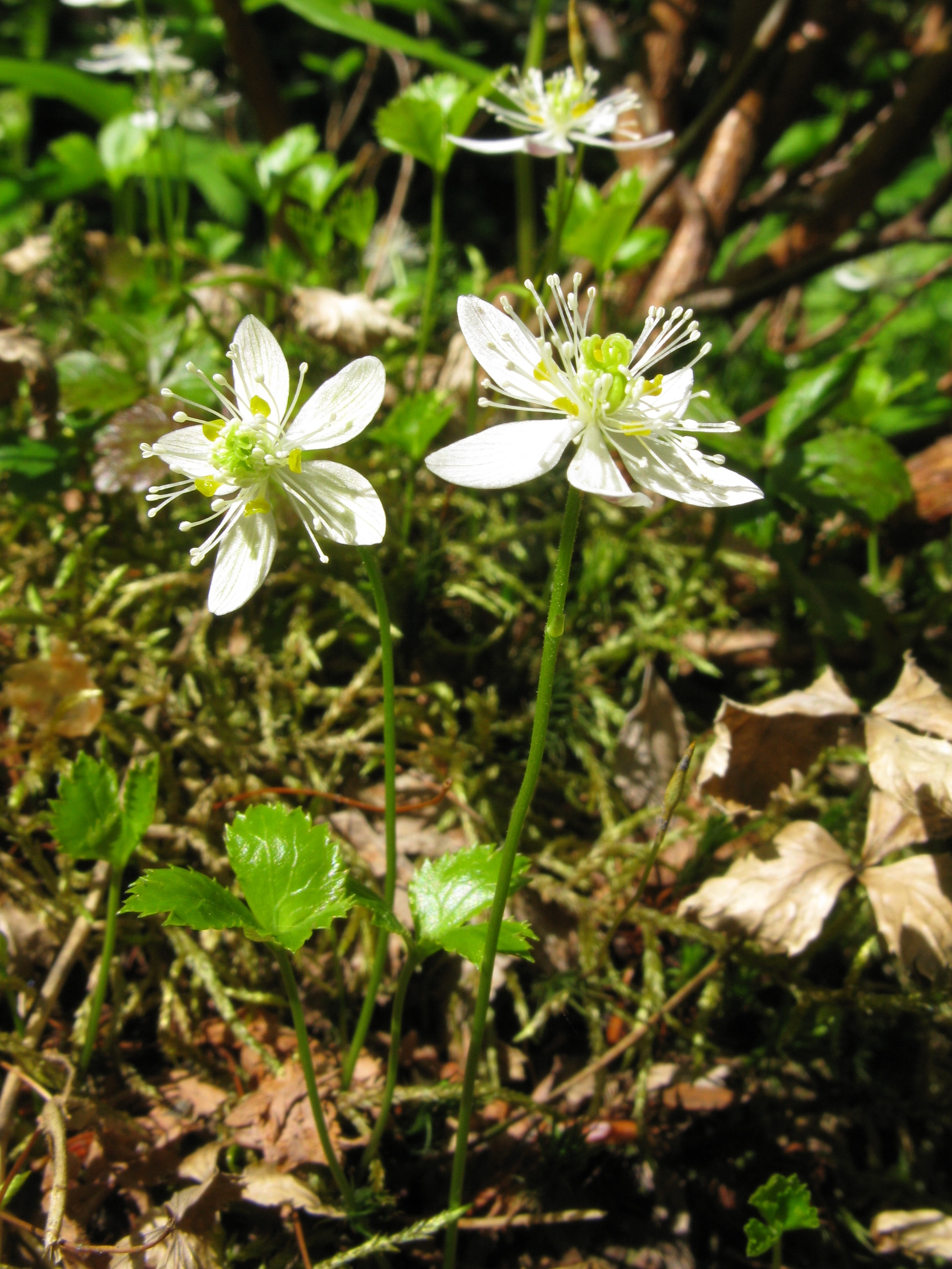
Coptidoideae:
Coptis trifolia

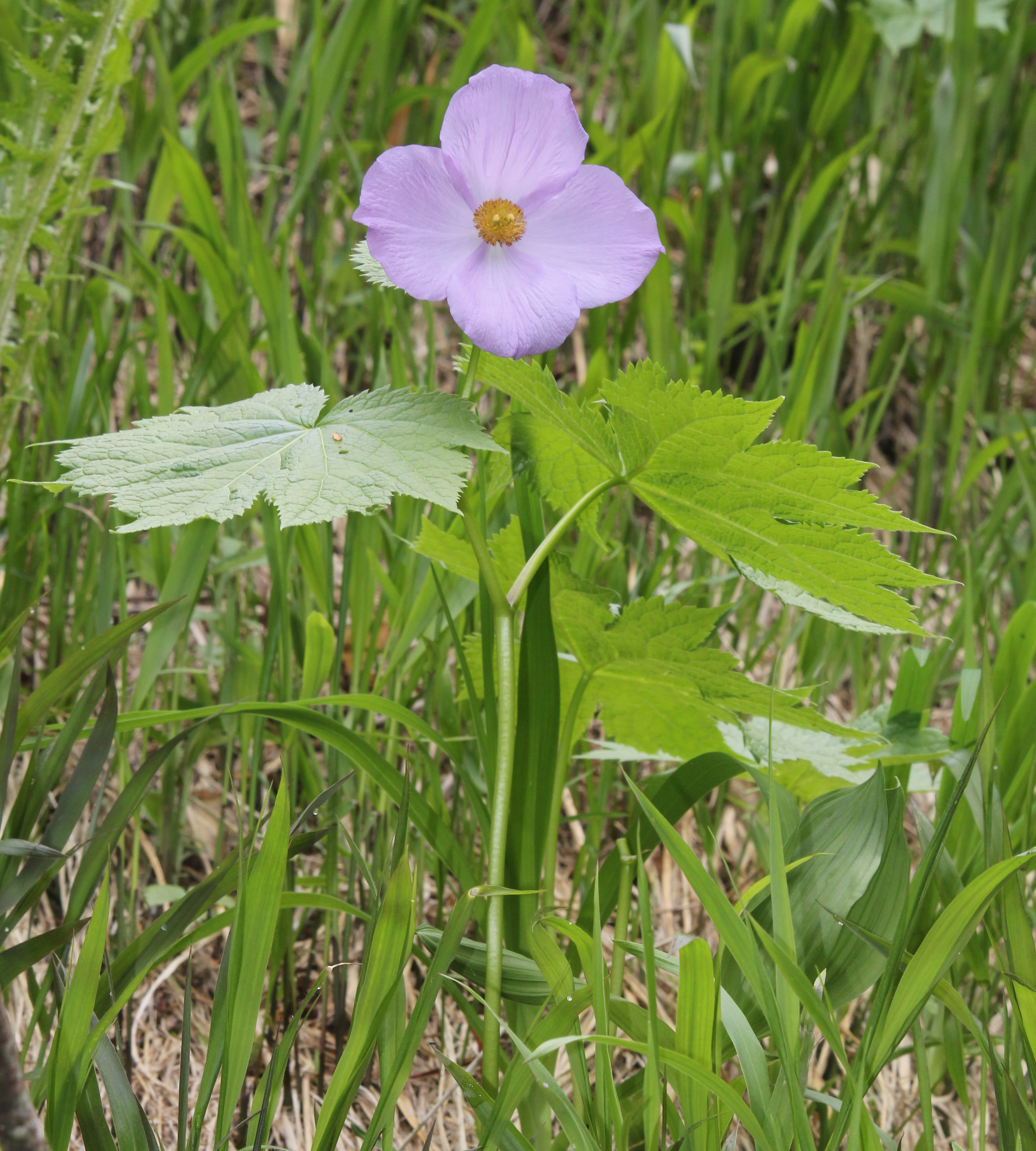
Glaucidioideae:
Glaucidium palmatum

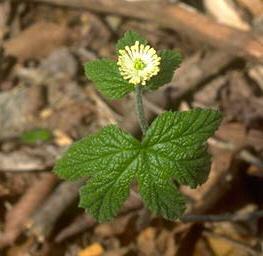
Hydrastidoideae:
Hydrastis canadensis

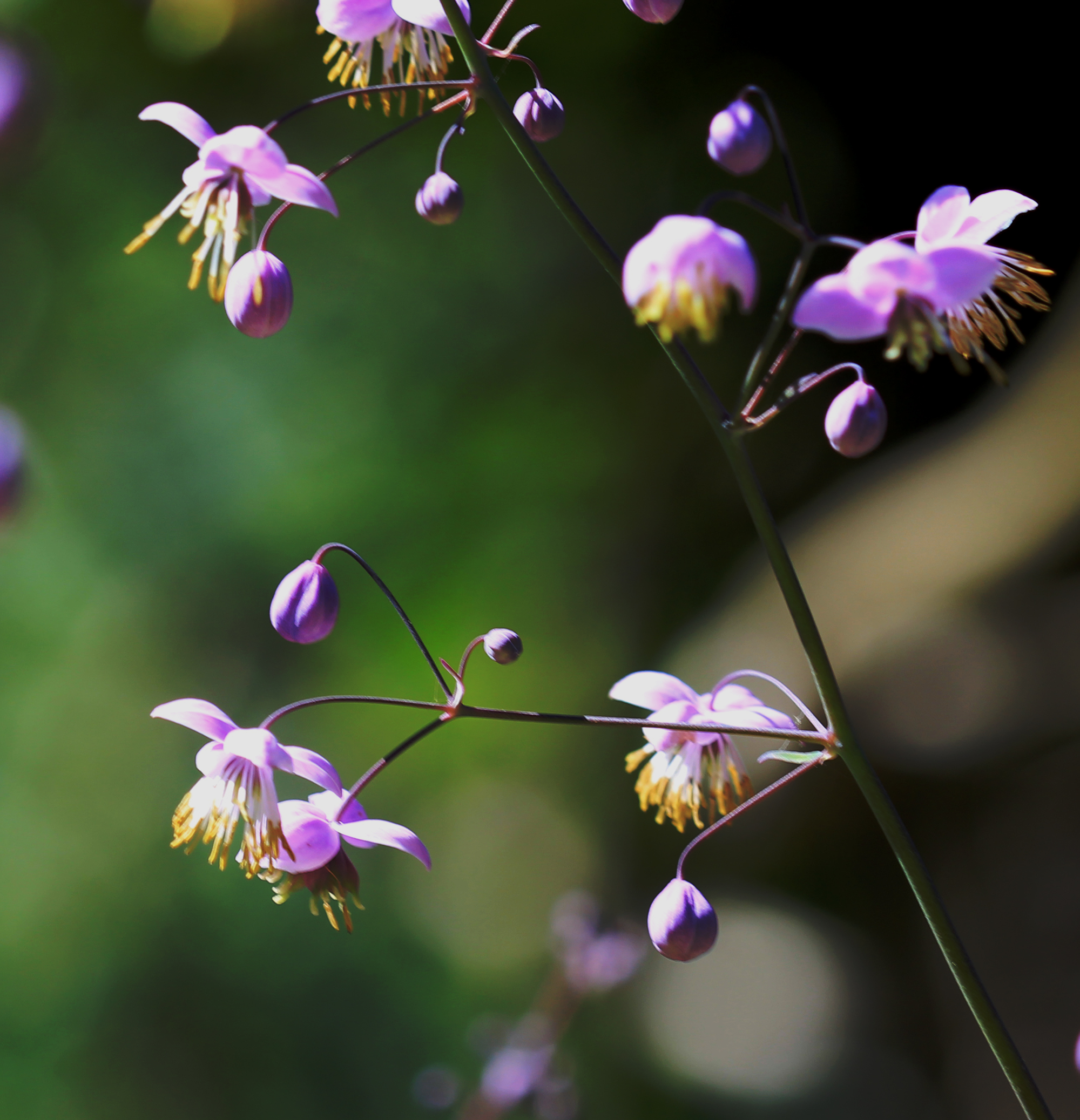
Thalictroideae:
Thalictrum delavayi

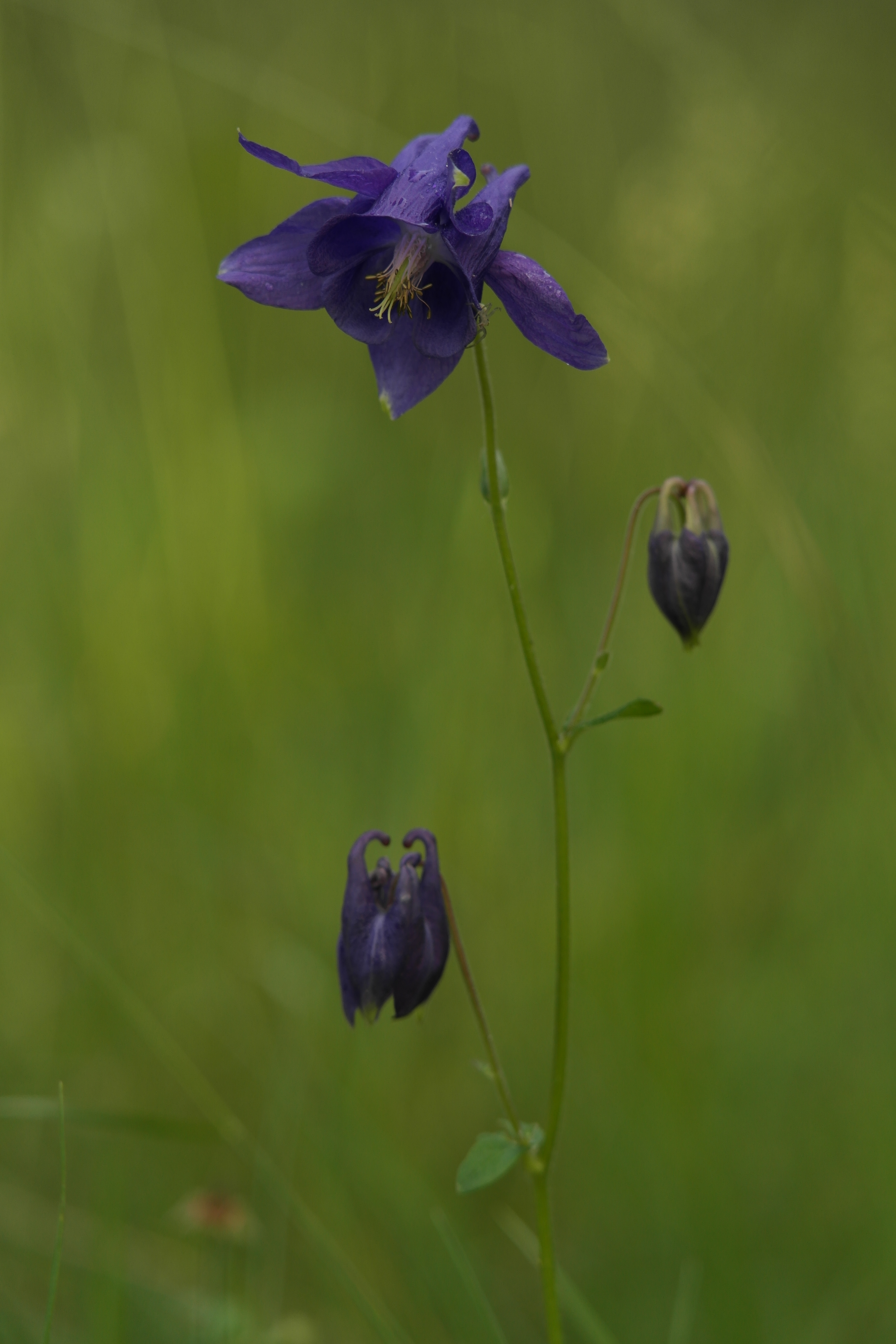
Thalictroideae:
Aquilegia vulgaris

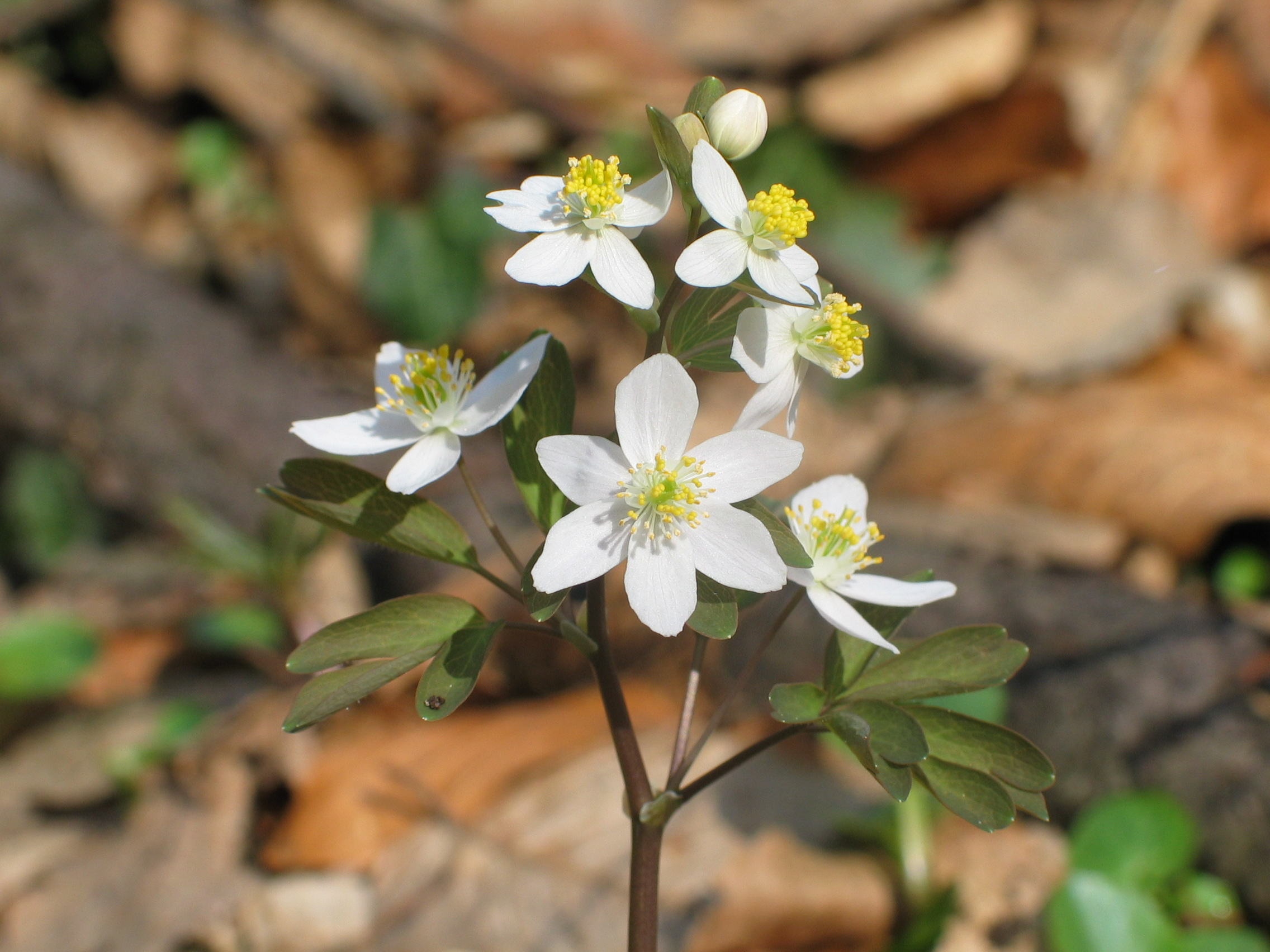
Thalictroideae:
Isopyrum thalictroides

== Bibliography ==
- Clapham, A.R.; Tutin, T.G.; Warburg, E.F. (1981). Excursion flora of the British Isles (3 ed.). Cambridge, U.K.: Cambridge University Press. ISBN 978-0-521-23290-6.
- Stace, C. A. (2010). New Flora of the British Isles (3 ed.). Cambridge, U.K.: Cambridge University Press. ISBN 978-0-521-70772-5.
- Ronse de Craene, L.P. (2010). Floral diagrams, an aid to understanding flower morphology and evolution. Cambridge University Press. ISBN 978-0-521-72945-1.
- Christenhusz, M. J. M.; Byng, J. W. (2016). "The number of known plants species in the world and its annual increase". Phytotaxa. 261 (3): 201–217. Bibcode:2016Phytx.261..201C. doi:10.11646/phytotaxa.261.3.1.
- Langlet, O. (1932). Uber Chromosomenverhaltnisse und Systematik der Ranunculaceae. Svensk Bot. Tidskr 26, 381–401.
- APG (2016). "An update of the Angiosperm Phylogeny Group classification for the orders and families of flowering plants: APG IV". Botanical Journal of the Linnean Society. 181 (1): 1–20. doi:10.1111/boj.12385.
- Keener, Carl S.; Reveal, James L.; Dutton, Bryan E.; Ziman, Svetlana (August 1999). "A List of Suprageneric Names in Ranunculaceae (Magnoliophyta)". Taxon. 48 (3): 497. Bibcode:1999Taxon..48..497K. doi:10.2307/1224562. JSTOR 1224562.
- Kubitzki, Klaus; Rohwer, Jens G.; Bittrich, Volker, eds. (1993). The Families and Genera of Vascular Plants. II Flowering plants - Dicotyledons. Magnoliid, Hamamelid and Caryophyllid families. Berlin: Springer. ISBN 978-3-540-55509-4.
  - Tamura, M (28 July 1993). Ranunculaceae. Springer. pp. 563–583. ISBN 978-3-540-55509-4., in Kubitzki et al (1993)
- Strasburger, Noll, Schenck, Schimper: Lehrbuch der Botanik für Hochschulen. 4. Auflage, Gustav Fischer, Jena 1900, p. 459 (flower diagrams)
- Pigg, K. B.; DeVore, M. L. (1 October 2005). "Paleoactaea gen. nov. (Ranunculaceae) fruits from the Paleogene of North Dakota and the London Clay". American Journal of Botany. 92 (10): 1650–1659. doi:10.3732/ajb.92.10.1650. PMID 21646082.
- Stevens, P.F. (2017) [2001], Angiosperm Phylogeny Website, Missouri Botanical Garden
- Sandro Pignatti. Flora d'Italia, Edagricole, Bologna 1982.(in Italian) ISBN 88-506-2449-2
- Kumazawa, Masao (1938). "Systematic and Phylogenetic Consideration of the Ranunculaceae and Berberidaceae". Shokubutsugaku Zasshi. 52 (613): 9–15. doi:10.15281/jplantres1887.52.9.
- Emadzade, Khatere; Lehnebach, Carlos; Lockhart, Peter; Elvira, Hörandl (June 2010). "A molecular phylogeny, morphology and classification of genera of Ranunculeae (Ranunculaceae)" (PDF). Taxon. 59 (3): 809–828. Bibcode:2010Taxon..59..809E. doi:10.1002/tax.593011. Archived from the original (PDF) on 20 September 2016.
- Wang, Wei; Lu, An-Ming; Ren, Yi; Endress, Mary E.; Chen, Zhi-Duan (January 2009). "Phylogeny and classification of Ranunculales: Evidence from four molecular loci and morphological data". Perspectives in Plant Ecology, Evolution and Systematics. 11 (2): 81–110. Bibcode:2009PPEES..11...81W. doi:10.1016/j.ppees.2009.01.001.
- Turner, NJ (July 1984). "Counter-irritant and other medicinal uses of plants in Ranunculaceae by native peoples in British Columbia and neighbouring areas". Journal of Ethnopharmacology. 11 (2): 181–201. doi:10.1016/0378-8741(84)90038-2. PMID 6387285.
- Whittemore, Alan T.; Parfitt, Bruce D. (1997). "Ranunculaceae". In Flora of North America Editorial Committee (ed.). Flora of North America North of Mexico (FNA). Vol. 3. New York and Oxford: Oxford University Press – via eFloras.org, Missouri Botanical Garden, St. Louis, MO & Harvard University Herbaria, Cambridge, MA.
- The Plant List (2013). "The Plant List Version 1.1". Royal Botanic Gardens, Kew and Missouri Botanical Garden.
