= Peltocalathos =

Scientific classification
- Kingdom: Plantae
- Clade: Tracheophytes
- Clade: Angiosperms
- Clade: Eudicots
- Order: Ranunculales
- Family: Ranunculaceae
- Subfamily: Ranunculoideae
- Tribe: Ranunculeae
- Genus: Peltocalathos; Tamura
- Species: P. baurii

Binomial name
- Peltocalathos baurii (MacOwan) Tamura

Genus of plants

Peltocalathos is a monotypic genus of flowering plants belonging to the family Ranunculaceae. The only species is Peltocalathos baurii.

Its native range is Southern Africa.
