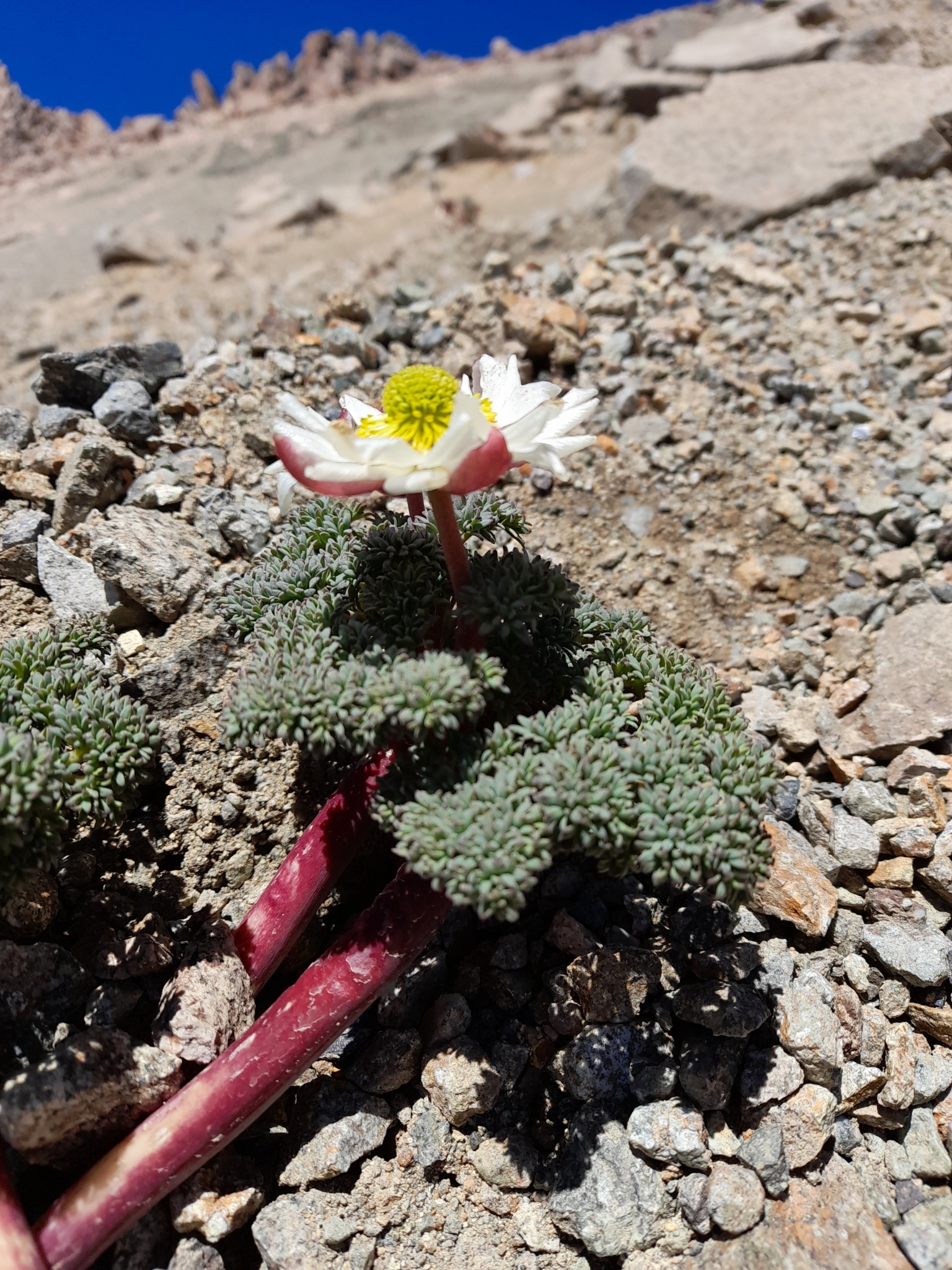
- Callianthemoides semiverticillata

Scientific classification
- Kingdom: Plantae
- Clade: Tracheophytes
- Clade: Angiosperms
- Clade: Eudicots
- Order: Ranunculales
- Family: Ranunculaceae
- Subfamily: Ranunculoideae
- Tribe: Ranunculeae
- Genus: Callianthemoides; Tamura
- Species: C. semiverticillata

Binomial name
- Callianthemoides semiverticillata (Phil.) Tamura

Synonyms
- Ranunculus semiverticillatus Phil.

= Callianthemoides =

Genus of flowering plants

Callianthemoides is a genus of plants in the family Ranunculaceae, with a single species, Callianthemoides semiverticillata. Native to screes in northern Patagonia, it has divided greyish or reddish green leaves and large white or pink flowers.

== Description ==
Callianthemoides semiverticillata is a strong-growing perennial with a deep rhizome. It has finely divided (dissected) leaves, greyish or reddish green in colour, up to 7 cm (2.8 in) across. The leaves do not fully develop until after the flowers appear. The flowering stems are violet-purple and carry one or more large flowers, up to 4 cm (1.6 in) across. Each flower has five white, purple-marked sepals and 10–20 petals, longer and narrower than the sepals, usually white but sometimes pink. It has been described as "arguably the most beautiful buttercup in the world".

== Taxonomy ==
The species was first described in 1861 by Rodolfo Amando Philippi as Ranunculus semiverticillatus. It was transferred to the newly created genus Callianthemoides in 1992 by Michio Tamura. The ending -oides means "similar to" or "resembling", so that Callianthemoides means "resembling Callianthemum".

Article 62.4 of the International Code of Nomenclature for algae, fungi, and plants explicitly states that genus names ending in -oides are feminine, so the correct name of the species when transferred to Callianthemoides is Callianthemoides semiverticillata. However, Tamura incorrectly used the masculine ending -us (i.e. C. semiverticillatus), which some sources have copied. The adjective verticillatus means "whorled", so that the epithet semiverticillata means "half or partially whorled".

== Distribution and habitat ==
Callianthemoides semiverticillata is native to the northern part of Patagonia (Chile and Argentina). It grows in bare, often loose screes in mountains, at 1,500–2,300 m (4,900–7,500 ft), emerging from the ground in spring at the edge of the melting snow.

== Cultivation ==
Callianthemoides semiverticillata is grown by gardeners specializing in alpine plants. It is grown in pots under glass and in raised beds and containers outside, but has produced smaller flowers than in the wild. It has been described as "choice" but "difficult to cultivate".
