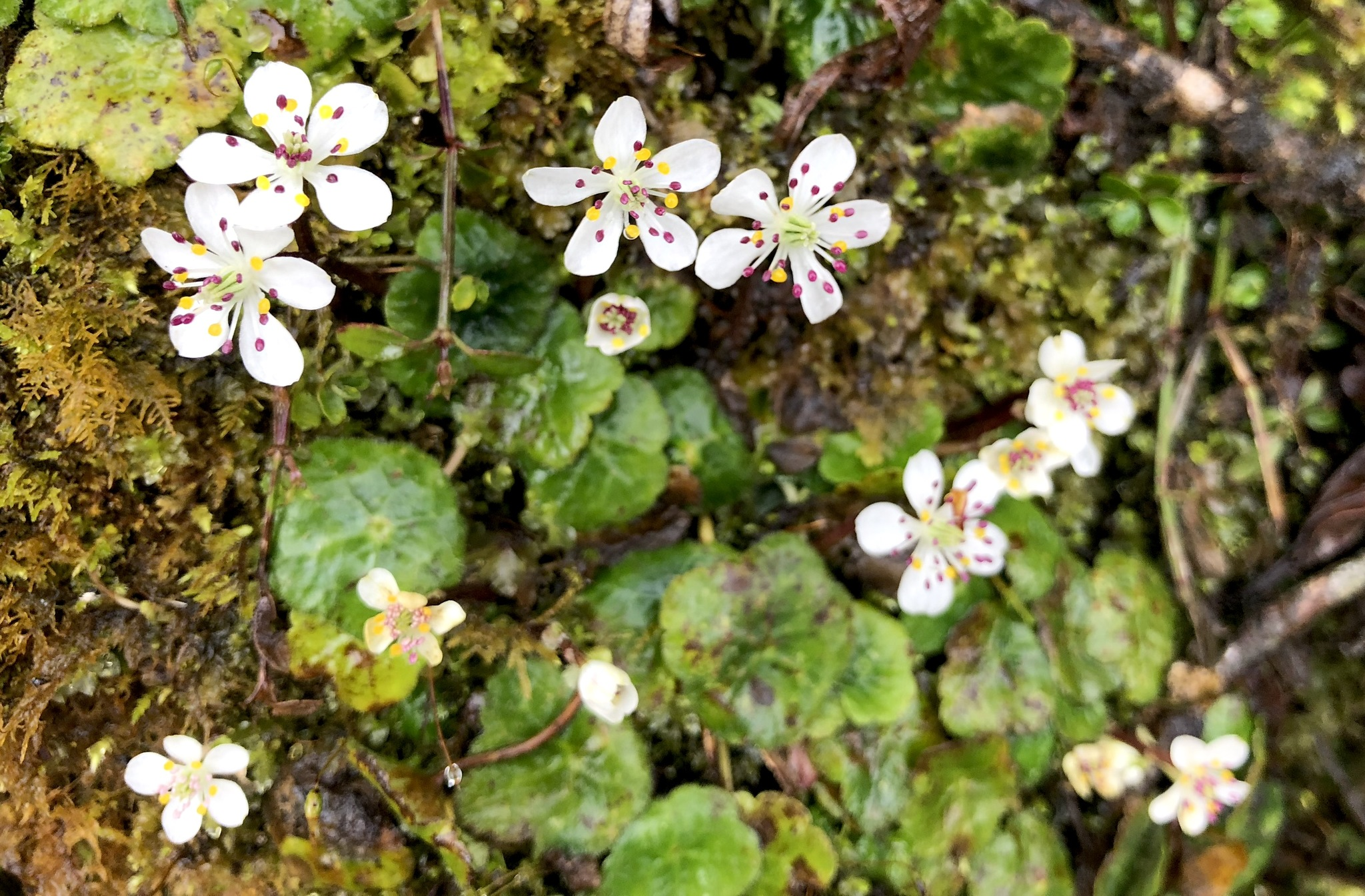
- Asteropyrum peltatum

Scientific classification
- Kingdom: Plantae
- Clade: Tracheophytes
- Clade: Angiosperms
- Clade: Eudicots
- Order: Ranunculales
- Family: Ranunculaceae
- Subfamily: Ranunculoideae
- Tribe: Asteropyreae; W.T.Wang & C.Yu Chang
- Genus: Asteropyrum; J.R.Drumm. & Hutch.

= Asteropyrum =

Genus of flowering plants

Asteropyrum is a genus of flowering plants belonging to the family Ranunculaceae.

Its native range is Eastern Himalaya to China.

Species:

- Asteropyrum cavaleriei (H.Lév. & Vaniot) J.R.Drumm. & Hutch.
- Asteropyrum peltatum (Franch.) J.R.Drumm. & Hutch.
