= Calathodes =

Scientific classification
- Kingdom: Plantae
- Clade: Tracheophytes
- Clade: Angiosperms
- Clade: Eudicots
- Order: Ranunculales
- Family: Ranunculaceae
- Genus: Calathodes; Hook.f. & Thomson

Genus of flowering plants

Calathodes is a genus of flowering plants belonging to the family Ranunculaceae.

Its native range is Himalaya to Taiwan.

Species:

- Calathodes oxycarpa Sprague
- Calathodes palmata Hook.f. & Thomson
- Calathodes polycarpa Ohwi
- Calathodes unciformis W.T.Wang
