= Paroxygraphis =

Scientific classification
- Kingdom: Plantae
- Clade: Tracheophytes
- Clade: Angiosperms
- Clade: Eudicots
- Order: Ranunculales
- Family: Ranunculaceae
- Subfamily: Ranunculoideae
- Tribe: Ranunculeae
- Genus: Paroxygraphis; W.W.Sm.
- Species: P. sikkimensis

Binomial name
- Paroxygraphis sikkimensis W.W.Sm.

Genus of flowering plants

Paroxygraphis is a genus of flowering plants belonging to the family Ranunculaceae. The only species is Paroxygraphis sikkimensis.

Its native range is Himalaya.
