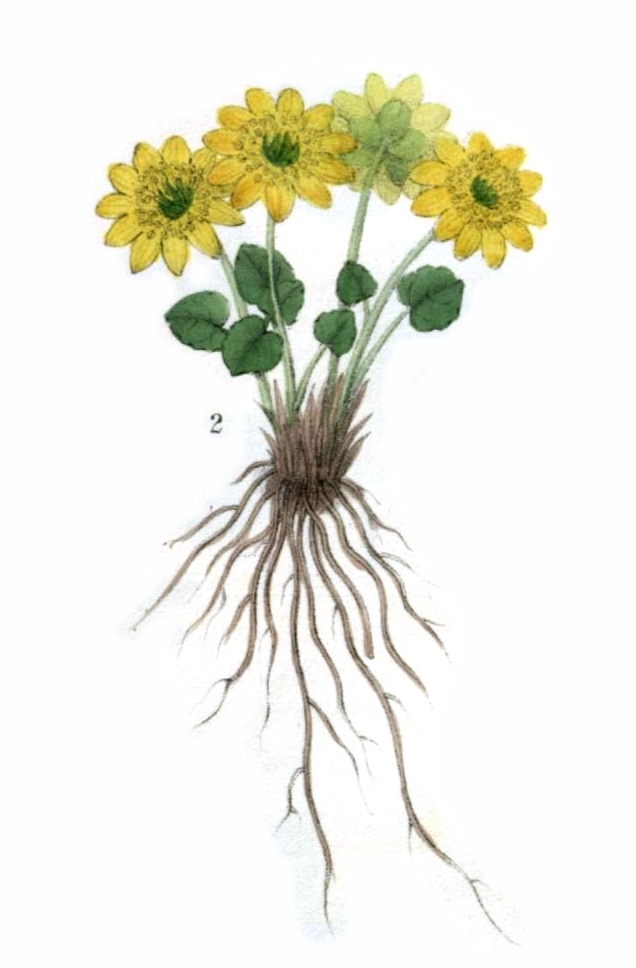
- Oxygraphis endlicheri

Scientific classification
- Kingdom: Plantae
- Clade: Tracheophytes
- Clade: Angiosperms
- Clade: Eudicots
- Order: Ranunculales
- Family: Ranunculaceae
- Subfamily: Ranunculoideae
- Tribe: Ranunculeae
- Genus: Oxygraphis; Bunge

= Oxygraphis =

Genus of flowering plants

Oxygraphis is a genus of flowering plants belonging to the family Ranunculaceae.

Its native range is Europe, Tropical Asia, Northern America and Temperate Asia.

Species:

- Oxygraphis chrysocycla Rech.f.
- Oxygraphis delavayi Franch.
