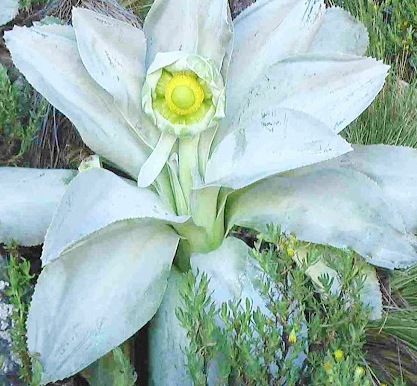

Scientific classification
- Kingdom: Plantae
- Clade: Tracheophytes
- Clade: Angiosperms
- Clade: Eudicots
- Order: Ranunculales
- Family: Ranunculaceae
- Subfamily: Ranunculoideae
- Tribe: Ranunculeae
- Genus: Laccopetalum; Ulbr.
- Species: L. giganteum

Binomial name
- Laccopetalum giganteum (Wedd.) Ulbr.

Synonyms
- Ranunculus giganteus Wedd.

= Laccopetalum =

Species of plant

Laccopetalum is a monotypic genus of flowering plants in the family Ranunculaceae. The genus contains only one species, Laccopetalum giganteum, which is endemic to Peru.
