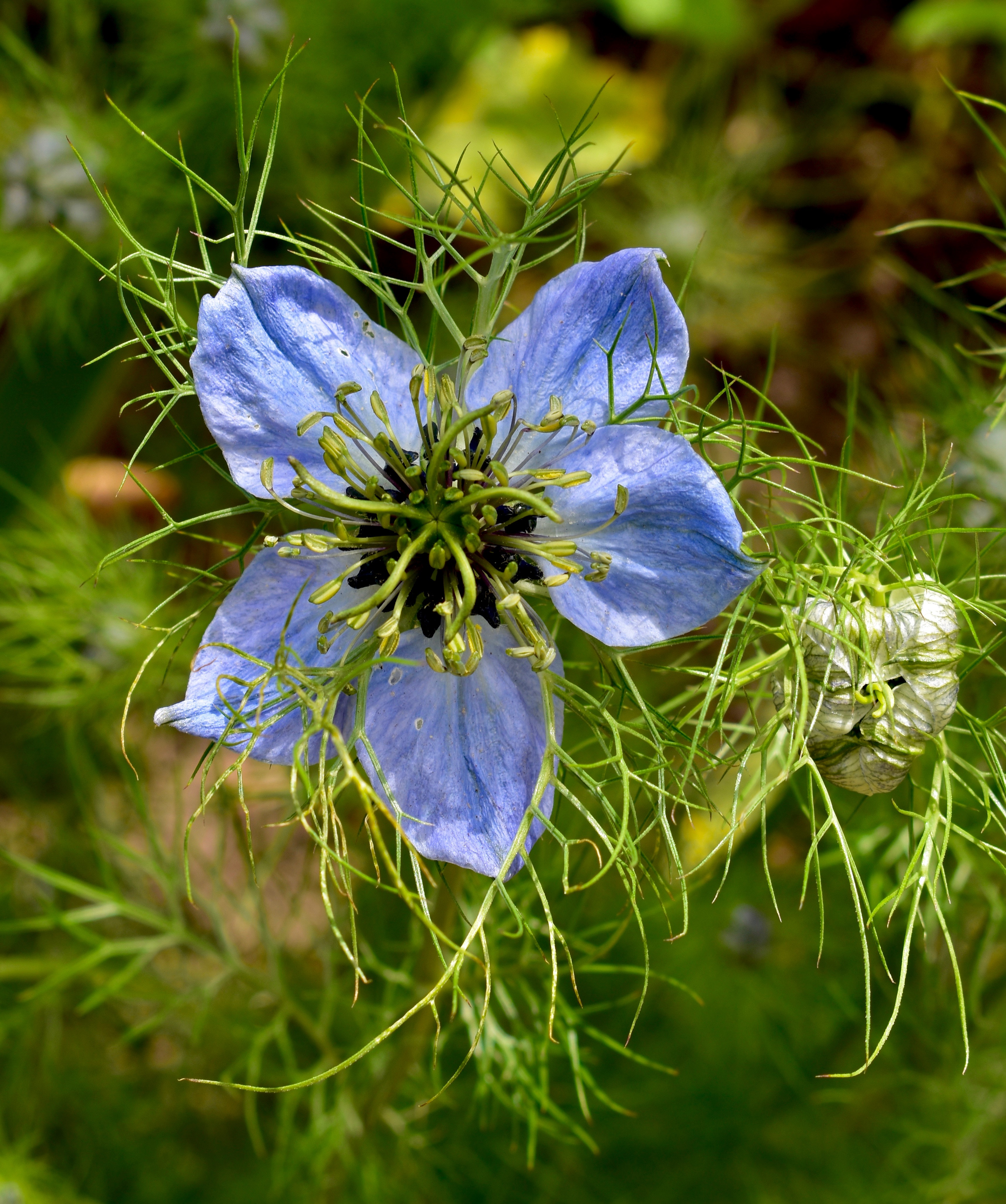

Scientific classification
- Kingdom: Plantae
- Clade: Tracheophytes
- Clade: Angiosperms
- Clade: Eudicots
- Order: Ranunculales
- Family: Ranunculaceae
- Subfamily: Ranunculoideae; Arn.

Tribes
- Adonideae; Anemoneae; Asteropyreae; Callianthemeae; Caltheae; Cimicifugeae; Delphinieae; Helleboreae; Nigelleae; Ranunculeae

= Ranunculoideae =

Subfamily of flowering plants

Ranunculoideae is a subfamily of the family Ranunculaceae. Ranunculoideae currently has ten accepted tribes.

== Tribes ==
- Adonideae
- Anemoneae
- Asteropyreae
- Callianthemeae
- Caltheae
- Cimicifugeae
- Delphinieae
- Helleboreae
- Nigelleae
- Ranunculeae
