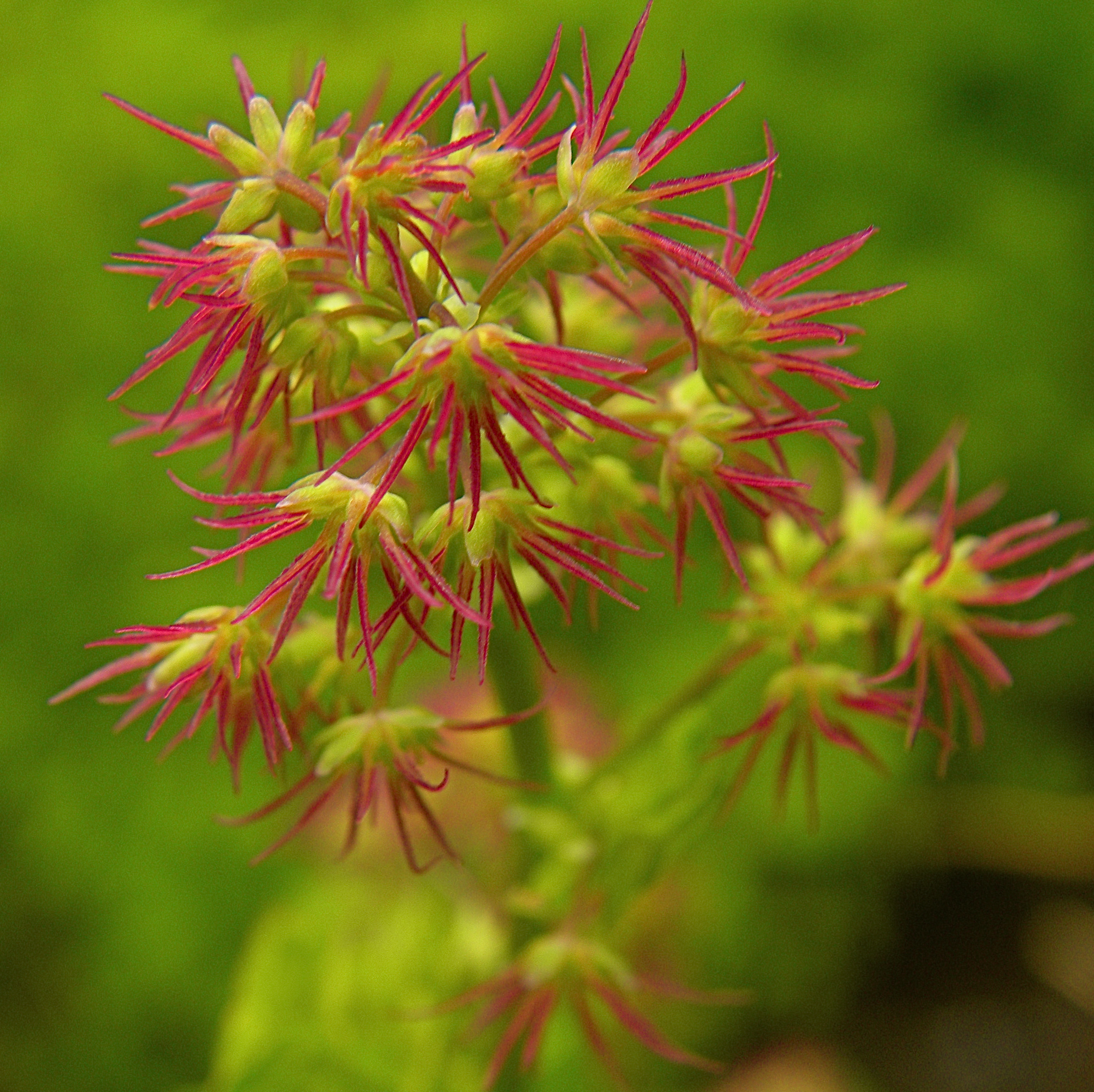
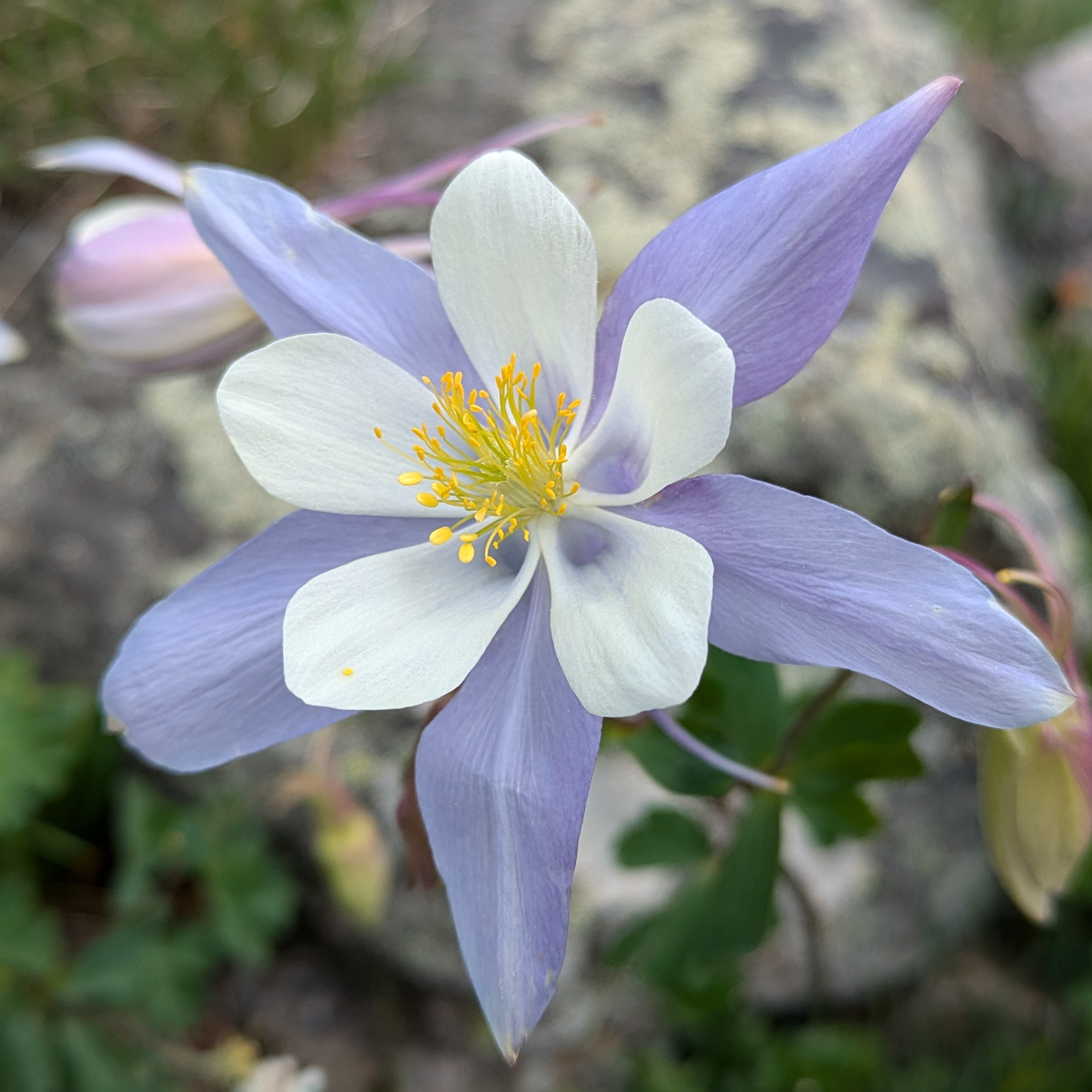
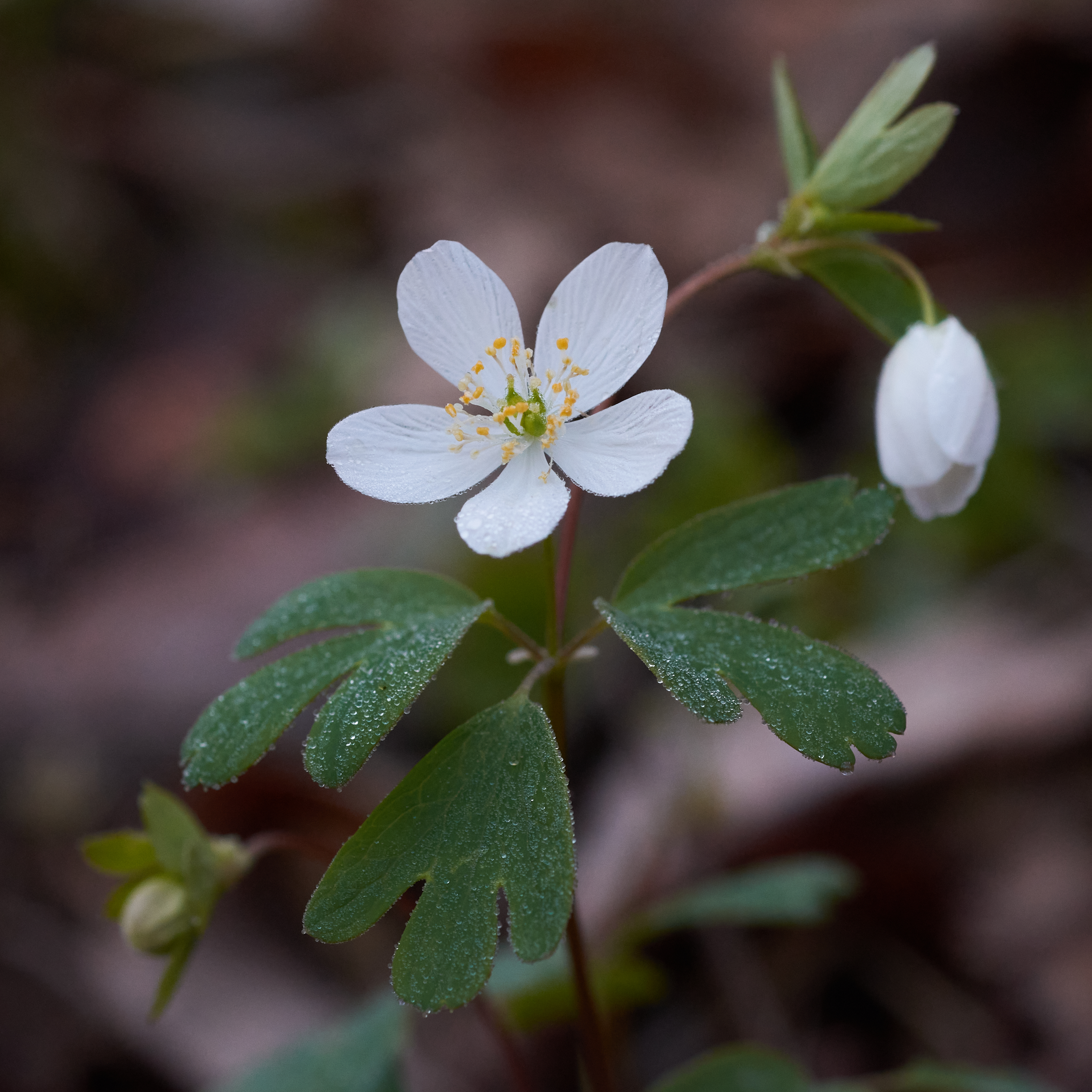
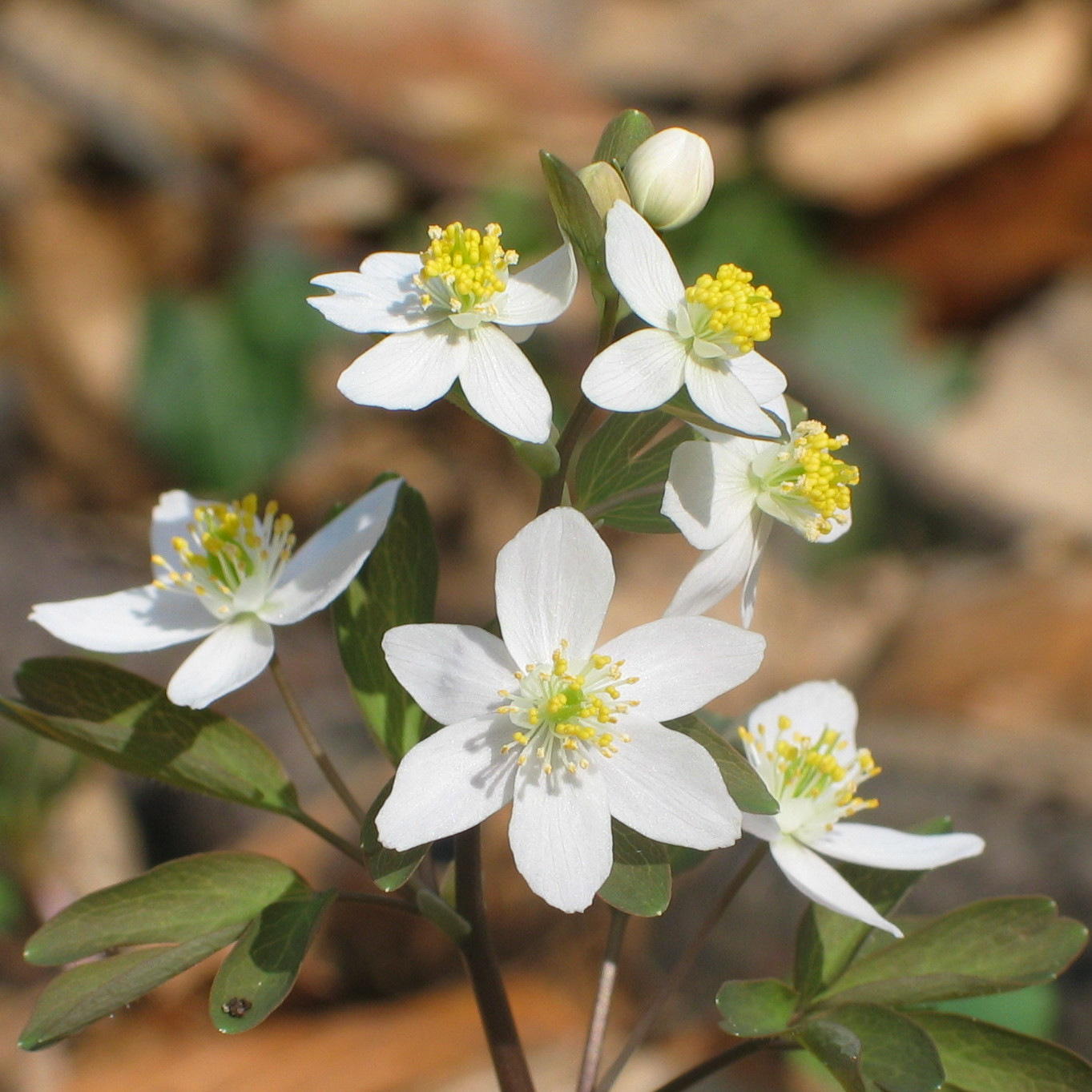
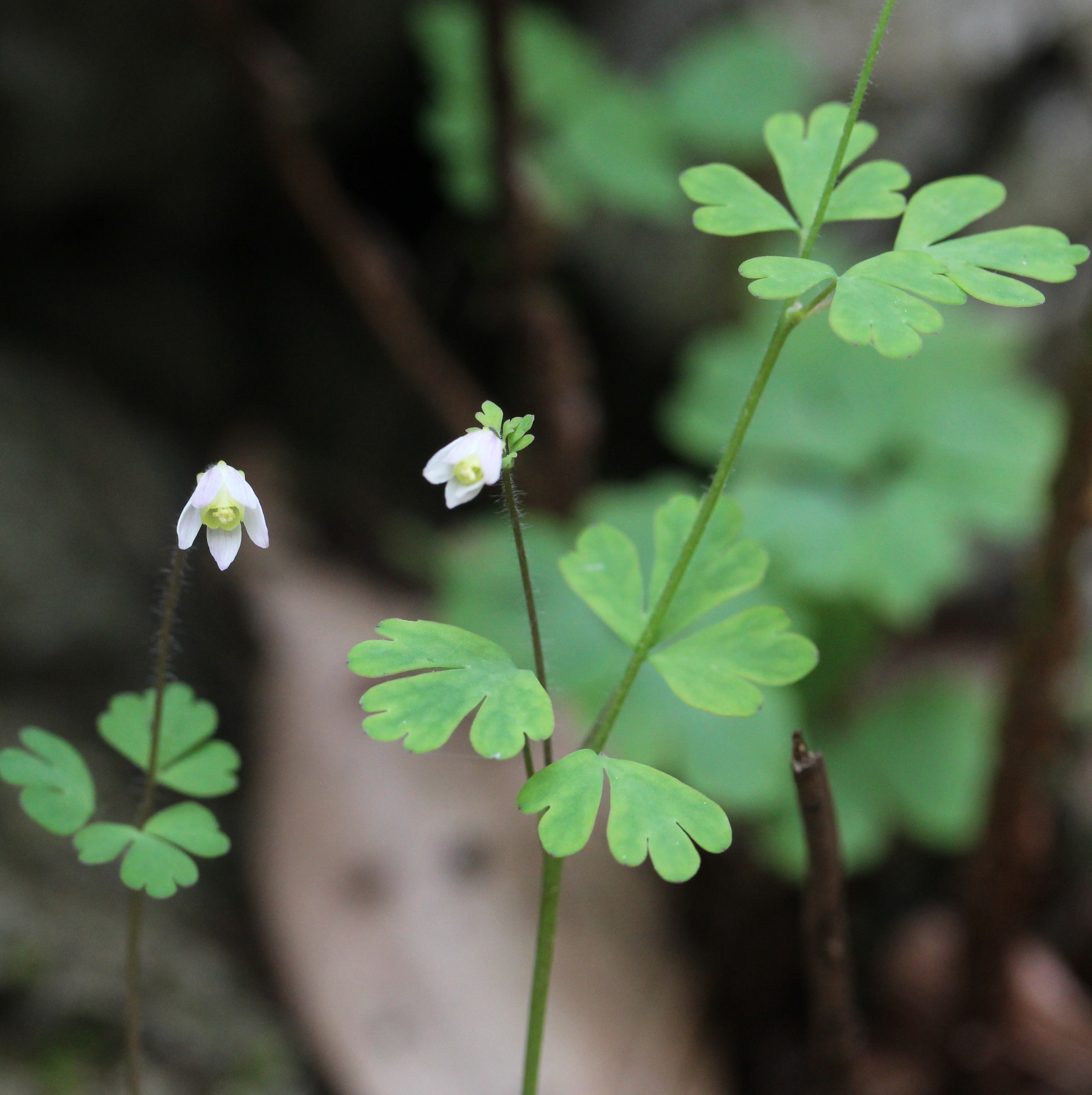
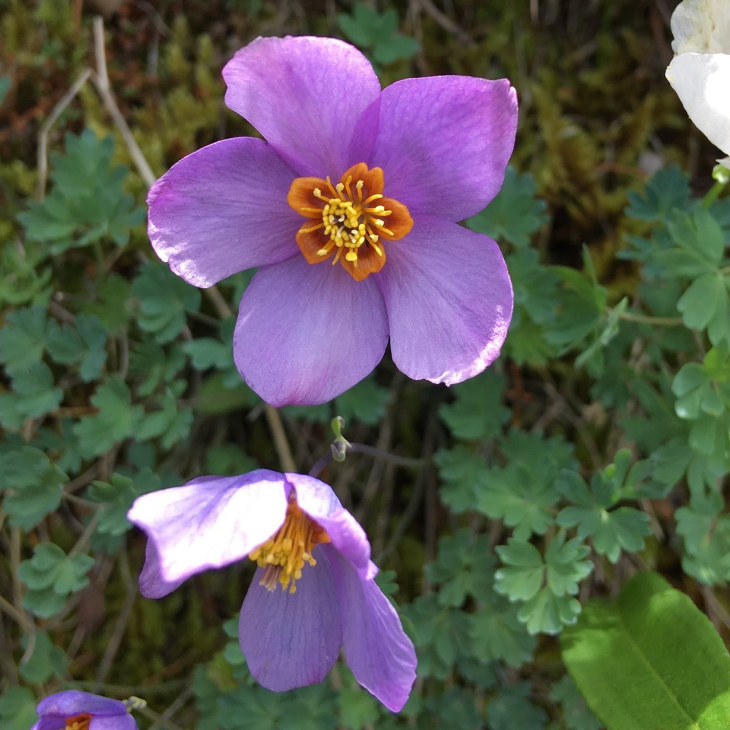
- Clockwise from upper left: Thalictrum occidentale, Aquilegia coerulea, Isopyrum thalictroides, Paraquilegia anemonoides, Semiaquilegia adoxoides, Enemion biternatum

Scientific classification
- Kingdom: Plantae
- Clade: Tracheophytes
- Clade: Angiosperms
- Clade: Eudicots
- Order: Ranunculales
- Family: Ranunculaceae
- Subfamily: Thalictroideae; Rafinesque

Type genus
- Thalictrum Tourn. ex L.

Genera
- List: Aquilegia; Cymatenemion; Dichocarpum; Enemion; Isopyrum; Leptopyrum; Neoenemion; Paraquilegia; Paropyrum; Semiaquilegia; Thalictrum; Urophysa

Synonyms
- Isopyroideae M.N.Tamura

= Thalictroideae =

Subfamily of flowering plants

Thalictroideae is a subfamily of herbaceous flowering plants in the family Ranunculaceae (buttercups). The subfamily comprises twelve genera – including the type genus Thalictrum – which themselves contain at least 320 species. The native ranges of species within Thalictroideae are widely distributed across the Northern Hemisphere, with the subfamily's center of diversity located in East Asia. Modern native ranges among Thalictroideae species span Eurasia, Africa, and the Americas. Taxa of this subfamily have been the subject of substantial scientific study, with Aquilegia serving as a model system for a variety of fields. Thalictroideae have also been utilized in horticultural and medicinal contexts.

Genetic evidence suggests that the last common ancestor of all current Thalictroideae probably lived in East Asia sometime in the late Eocene, approximately 36 million years ago. The current distribution of Thalictroideae is the product of at least 46 dispersal events since the early Miocene, including at least 45 since the Middle Miocene Climatic Optimum of approximately 17 to 14 million years ago. The dispersal of Thalictroideae was bidirectional: there were dispersals out of East Asia to Europe and North America, with other dispersals from those continents towards East Asia.

Thalictroideae is monophyletic. The subfamily contains a single tribe, Thalictreae. Following a 2026 taxonomic revision, the subfamily was divided into twelve monophyletic genera that are sorted into three recognized clades. One clade contains Aquilegia, Semiaquilegia, and Urophysa. Another clade is formed by Cymatenemion, Enemion, Isopyrum, and Neoenemion. A third clade contains Leptopyrum, Paraquilegia, Paropyrum, and Thalictrum.

== Description ==
Thalictroideae is a subfamily within the family Ranunculaceae (the buttercup family).

The subfamily possesses Thalictrum-type (T-type) chromosomes, one of two types of chromosomes present in Ranunculaceae. This type of chromosome is characterized as small and generally simply curved. The basic chromosome number for the subfamily is n=7. However, the chromosome number for the genus Dichocarpum is n=6.

== Taxonomy ==
Thalictroideae is one of five subfamilies of the family Ranunculaceae. Thalictroideae and its sister subfamily Ranunculoideae are the latest subfamilies to diverge within Ranunculaceae. Genetic evidence strongly supports Thalictroideae as a monophyletic grouping.

The subfamily contains a single tribe, Thalictreae. Within the tribe are twelve genera comprising at least 320 herbaceous species. The most speciated genera of the subfamily are the type genus Thalictrum (approximately 200 species) and Aquilegia (approximately 130 species).

=== Taxonomic history ===
The subfamily Thalictroideae was first described in 1815 by the French naturalist Constantine Samuel Rafinesque in his book Analyse de la nature. In his French-language description, Rafinesque used the name "Thalictrinia"; this was subsequently accepted as Thalictroideae.

Historically, fruit and flower morphology were used to understand the subfamilial and tribal relationships within Ranunculaceae. Since the Swedish scientist Olof Langlet's 1927 and 1932 studies, cytological characteristics like chromosome number and chromosome size have also been used.

In 1968, the Japanese botanist Minoru N. Tamura described the subfamily "Isopyroideae". After some use in later publications, this description and name was synonymized to the earlier name Thalictroideae. Tamura described Thalictroideae as a T-chromosome subfamily containing only the tribe Thalictreae and the genus Thalictrum, with the other genera now accepted as within Thalictroideae within a segregated Isopyroideae. In his 1993 survey of Ranunculaceae, Tamura utilized chromosomal and floral characteristics to describe five subfamilies, including both Isopyroideae and Thalictroideae. Tamura attributed the name "Isopyroideae" to a 1909 article by the Austrian botanist Rudolf Schrödinger in the journal Abhandlungen der Zoologisch-Botanischen Gesellschaft in Wien.

In a 1990 paper, the Chinese botanist De Zhi Fu instead assessed Thalictroideae as containing all Ranunculaceae with stable T-chromosomes, distinguishing them from R-chromosome species that have evolved to a smaller size similar to T-chromosomes. A previous study had reassessed the genus Calathodes as having T-chromosomes, which led Fu to place it within a basal tribe in Thalictroideae; later research restored the understanding of Calathodes as an R-chromosome genus.

=== Evolution ===
There are no reliable Thalictroideae fossils, with genetic evidence serving as the basis for understanding the subfamily's evolution. A 2024 study of Thalictroideae genetics suggests that the last common ancestor of the entire subfamily probably lived in East Asia sometime in the late Eocene, approximately 36 million years ago. This ancestor was probably native to East Asian deciduous forests. The genetic evidence supports that it was in that setting that each of the lineages that form the three major clades of Thalictroideae diverged over a period of 1 to 4 million years. Within these East Asian forests during that period, Thalictroideae's rapid diversification would not have been unique: this diversification was also exhibited by both Fagus (the genus containing beech trees) and Actaea (a genus in the Ranunculoideae subfamily).

Significant climatic shifts occurred between 36 and 10 million years ago in East Asia. However, relict species were preserved in climatically stable refugia. Genetic evidence suggests that the survival of relict plants contributed to a steadier diversification within Thalictroideae between the late Eocene and the late Miocene, consistent with other East Asian plant lineages. East Asian Thalictroideae again rapidly diversified approximately 10 million years ago, coinciding with a period of super monsoons in East Asia 12 to 4 million years ago. The 2024 genetic study found that the divergence within the clade containing Urophysa, Semiaquilegia, and Aquilegia occurred over a relatively short 1 million-year-long period approximately 9 to 8 million years ago.

The current distribution of Thalictroideae is the product of at least 46 dispersal events since the early Miocene, including at least 45 since the Middle Miocene Climatic Optimum of approximately 17 to 14 million years ago. The dispersal of Thalictroideae was bidirectional: there were dispersals out of East Asia to Europe and North America, with other dispersals from those continents towards East Asia. Thalictroideae probably reached North America via Beringia, a land bridge where the Bering Strait now exists.

=== Genera ===
The subfamily contains twelve genera:

- Aquilegia
- Cymatenemion
- Dichocarpum
- Enemion
- Isopyrum
- Leptopyrum
- Neoenemion
- Paraquilegia
- Paropyrum
- Semiaquilegia
- Thalictrum
- Urophysa

== Distribution ==
Members of Thalictroideae are widely distributed over the Northern Hemisphere, with the subfamily's center of diversity in East Asia. There is a substantial degree of endemism within the subfamily. East Asia is the region with the most genera, species, and endemics from Thalictroideae. Several of the subfamily's genera have ranges that span Eurasia, with a few reaching the Americas. Some native ranges of Thalictrum species reach Africa and South America, while native ranges of Aquilegia species can reach North Africa and northern Mexico. Neoenemion is exclusively found in western North America.
