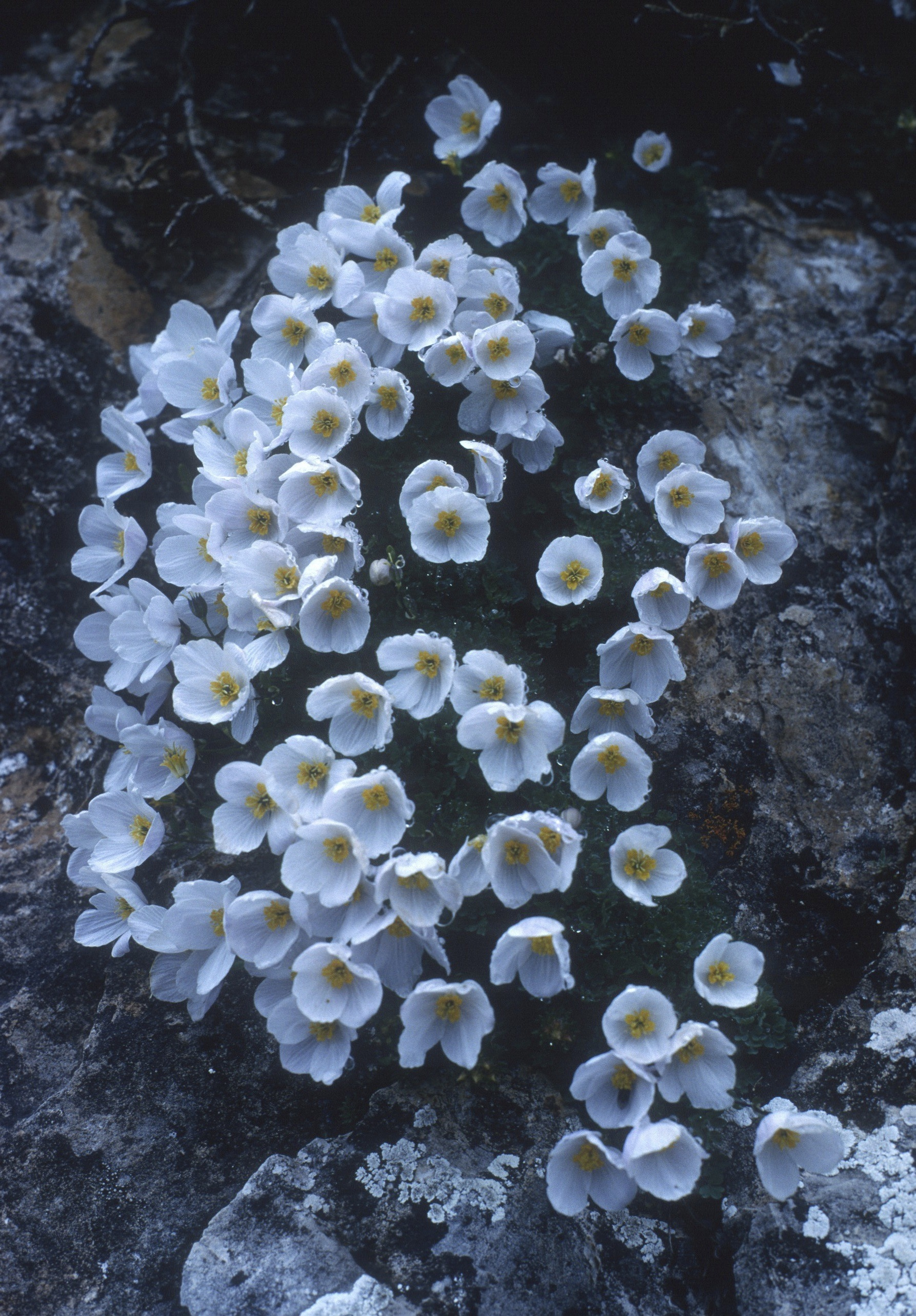
- A wild Paraquilegia microphylla in Sichuan, China

Scientific classification
- Kingdom: Plantae
- Clade: Tracheophytes
- Clade: Angiosperms
- Clade: Eudicots
- Order: Ranunculales
- Family: Ranunculaceae
- Genus: Paraquilegia
- Species: P. microphylla

Binomial name
- Paraquilegia microphylla (Royle) J.R.Drumm. & Hutch.

Synonyms
- Isopyrum microphyllum Royle; Isopyrum grandiflorum var. microphyllum (Royle) Finet & Gagnep.

= Paraquilegia microphylla =

Species of flowering plant

Paraquilegia microphylla is a species of perennial flowering plant in the family Ranunculaceae. It is native across a range spanning Siberia, Central Asia into the Himalayas, and east to Japan. The species has flowers that vary in color across its range, with P. microphylla in the western Himalayas possessing small white flowers while those in the eastern Himalayas produce larger lilac flowers.

P. microphylla is the most common member of the genus Paraquilegia in cultivation, though it is often misidentified as Paraquilegia anemonoides. P. microphylla seeds have been introduced to gardeners outside its native range from seed-collecting expeditions to western China and the Himalayas, though the species remains rare in cultivation.

== Description ==
Paraquilegia microphylla is a species of perennial herb in the genus Paraquilegia in the family Ranunculaceae. The plant's appearance is highly variable, particularly with regards to its leaves and flower color. Overall, the P. microphylla is similar Paraquilegia anemonoides and Paraquilegia caespitosa. Some differences can be observed in the leaves, which are generally smaller and glabrously biternate on P. microphylla.

The leaves of the plant are biternate on petioles that are between 2.5 cm (0.98 in) and 11 cm (4.3 in) long. A cushion plant, the overall width can reach and occasionally exceed 40 cm (16 in) in mature plants. The densely packed stems will become covered by the remains of old petioles over multiple season. These stems are among the variable elements of the species, with some plants observed as tightly tufted with short, densely packed stems. Other plants, even sometimes within the same population, can present with thinner, more loosely arranged stems.

The species's flowers bloom from May to August. Flowering stems range from between 30 mm (1.2 in) to 150 mm (5.9 in) in height. The flowers are between 2.8 cm (1.1 in) and 5 cm (2.0 in) in diameter. All flowers in the genus possess five sepals and five shorter yellow petals. The sepals are generally purple to purplish red with rare occurrences of white examples. The species has flowers that vary in color across its range, with P. microphylla in the western Himalayas possessing small white flowers while those in the eastern Himalayas produce larger lilac flowers.

Fruiting occurs in August and September. The seeds of the species are smooth, hairless, and brown in color. The seeds, which are between 1.3 mm (0.051 in) and 1.8 mm (0.071 in) long, are narrowly ovoid and narrowly winged. Seeds generally require at least two years to germinate, producing seedlings described by American botanist and gardener Robert Nold as "incredibly small and look[ing] exactly like columbines dancing on the head of a pin". The fruit of P microphylla are occasionally partially developed prior to the sepals being shed, though this is less commonly the case than on P. caespitosa.

== Taxonomy ==
The species was first described in 1834 by the British botanist John Forbes Royle in his Illustrations of the botany and other branches of the natural history of the Himalayan Mountains and of the flora of Cashmere as a member of the genus Isopyrum with the name Isopyrum microphylla. Royle described the species base on an imperfect specimen that British botanist Christopher Grey-Wilson believed was in the herbarium of the Royal Botanic Gardens, Kew as of 2023. Though no type locality was given for this 1839 collection, Grey-Wilson believed that it was likely near Yamnotri in modern-day India.

The species was reappraised as a variety of Isopyrum grandiflorum (now P. anemonoides) by the French botanists Achille Eugène Finet and François Gagnepain in 1904. In a 1920 article for the Royal Botanic Gardens, Kew's Bulletin of Miscellaneous Information, the British botanists James Ramsay Drummond and John Hutchinson segragatated the genus Paraquilegia from Isopyrum and renamed the species Paraquilegia microphylla.

P. microphylla is frequently confused with P. anemonoides in both literature and internet sources as the two species share many characteristics. In A. J. C. Grierson's 1984 Flora of Bhutan, P. anemonoides is presented as the only member of the genus present in the country; however, the plant described was most likely a P. microphylla plant.

=== Etymology ===
The genus name Paraquilegia means "next to" or "besides" Aquilegia (the genera of columbines). While the leaves of Paraquilegia and columbines may have similar appearances, the flowers of Paraquilegia are more similar to those of the genus Anemone. The word aquilegia itself may come from the Latin word for "eagle", aquila, in reference to the columbine's petals' resemblance to eagle talons. Aquilegia may also derive from aquam legere, which is Latin for "to collect water", or aquilegium, a Latin word for a container of water. The specific name microphylla is Latin for "small-leaved".

== Distribution ==
Paraquilegia microphylla is native across a range spanning Siberian Russia, Central Asia into the Himalayas, and east to Japan. The plant is present across the Himalayas, only absent in the most westerly portions of this mountain range. The Chinese range of this species encompasses mountainous western China, including Tibet and Xizang, as well as Sichuan and Xinjiang. The Flora of China recorded the plant's range including Kazakhstan, Nepal, northern Pakistan, Sikkim in Bhutan, and Tajikistan.

P. microphylla prefers alpine and subarctic climates. It is primarily found upon cliffs and in rock fissures at altitudes between 2,700 m (8,900 ft) and 4,300 m (14,100 ft). On rare occasions, the species will populate sloping rocky meadows. P. microphylla prefers limestone soil.

=== Conservation ===
As of 2025, the Royal Botanic Gardens, Kew's Plants of the World Online predicted the extinction risk of P. microphylla as "not threatened" with a confidence level of "confident".

== Cultivation ==
Paraquilegia plants are cultivated by rock gardeners, with Nold observing that the genus is generally appraised as the domain of only "the most experienced growers". P. microphylla is the most common species of Paraquilegia in cultivation, though it is still comparatively rare. When exhibited, it is often misidentified as P. anemonoides. Several seed-collecting expeditions to western China and the Himalayas, a practice common during the 20th century, brought seeds back to both the United Kingdom and the United States.
