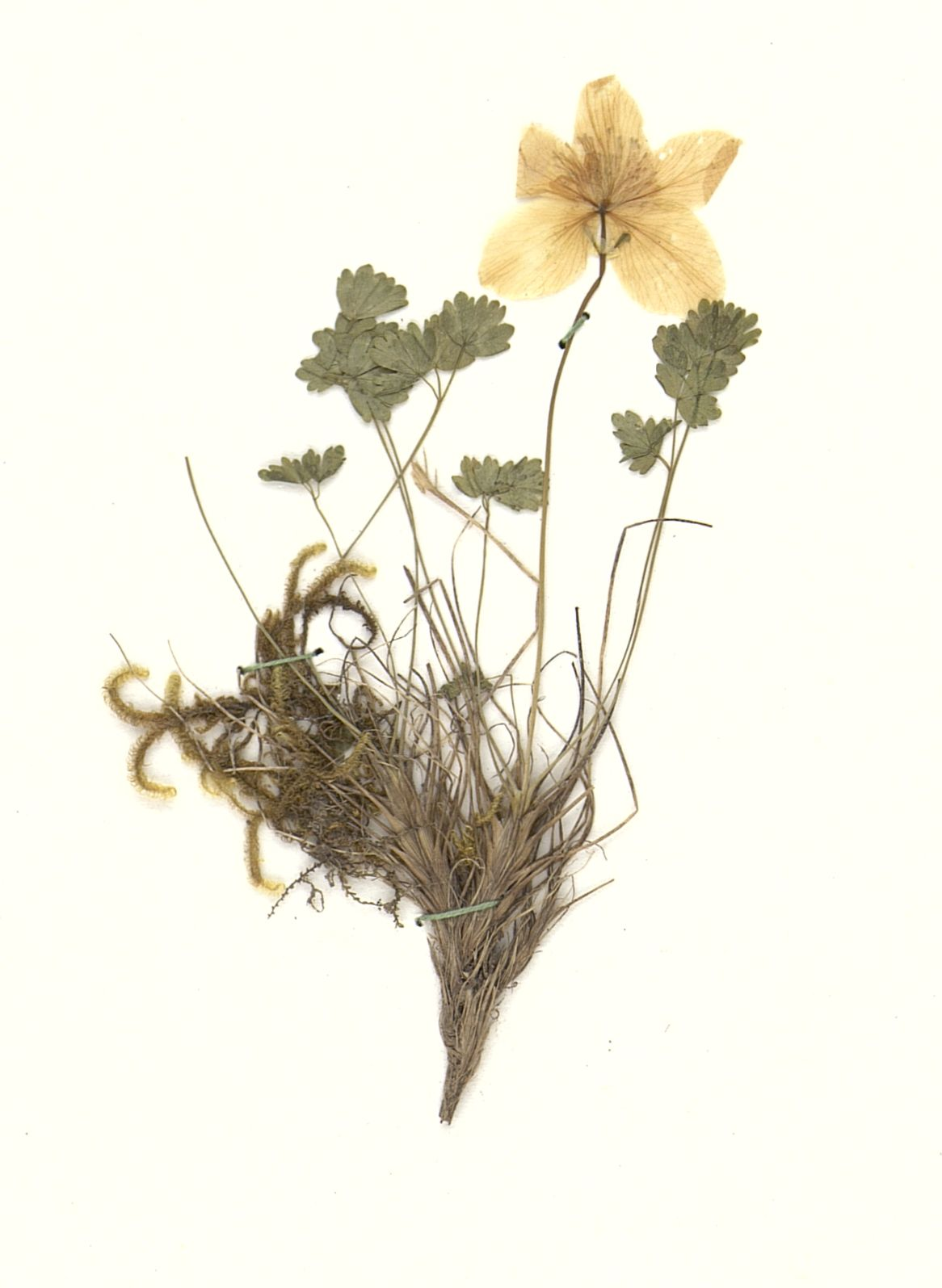
- Specimen of Paraquilegia caespitosa

Scientific classification
- Kingdom: Plantae
- Clade: Tracheophytes
- Clade: Angiosperms
- Clade: Eudicots
- Order: Ranunculales
- Family: Ranunculaceae
- Genus: Paraquilegia
- Species: P. caespitosa

Binomial name
- Paraquilegia caespitosa (Boiss. & Hohen.) J.R.Drumm. & Hutch.

Synonyms
- Isopyrum caespitosum Boiss. & Hohen

= Paraquilegia caespitosa =

Species of flowering plant

Paraquilegia caespitosa (Chinese: 密丛拟耧斗菜; pinyin: mi cong ni lou dou cai) is a species of perennial flowering plant in the family Ranunculaceae. It is native to a range spanning between northern Iran to the western Himalayas into China. As with other Paraquilegia, P. caespitosa is a cushion plant. The species forms dense tufts. The flowers appear singly on scapes up to 60 mm (2.4 in) long and possess purplish red to pink sepals and yellow petals.

== Description ==
Paraquilegia caespitosa is a species of perennial flowering plant in the genus Paraquilegia in the family Ranunculaceae. As with other Paraquilegia, the species is a cushion plant. It forms dense tufts at the base of the plant.

The leaves of the plant are ternate (in three parts) on petioles that are approximately 2 cm (0.79 in) long. The grayish-green blades of the leaves are broad and ovate, ranging from 6 mm (0.24 in) to 8 mm (0.31 in) long and 3 mm (0.12 in) to 4 mm (0.16 in) wide. The plants possess broadly obovate to broadly rhombic leaflets which range from 5 mm (0.20 in) to 9 mm (0.35 in) long and wide. The leaflets are borne on slender petiolules that are between 2 mm (0.079 in) and 9 mm (0.35 in) long.

The species's flowers bloom from late May to July. The flowers present singly on scapes and are between 2.5 cm (0.98 in) and 3 cm (1.2 in) in diameter. The scapes range from 35 mm (1.4 in) to 60 mm (2.4 in) long. All flowers in the genus possess five sepals and five shorter yellow petals. The sepals are purplish red to pink. These sepals are 12 mm (0.47 in) long and 7 mm (0.28 in) wide. The petals are narrowly obovate and range between 4 mm (0.16 in) and 6 mm (0.24 in) long.

Fruiting plants possess follicles that are approximately 1 cm (0.39 in) long. Follicles appear in sets of three to five, occasionally up to six. P. caespitosa seeds are highly wrinkled and approximately 2 mm (0.079 in) long. As in other Ranunculaceae plants, Paraquilegia seeds lose viability rapidly after they ripen.

P. caespitosa is distinct from other species of Paraquilegia in its possession of smaller leaves that are less divided and minutely divided. Also distinctive is that P. caespitosa fruit develop in the center of flowers prior to the flowers' fading. Within the genus, this feature is almost exclusive to P. caespitosa, though this characteristic has been occasionally observed in Paraquilegia microphylla.

== Taxonomy ==
The species was first described in 1849 by the Swiss botanists Pierre Edmond Boissier and Rudolph Friedrich Hohenacker under the name Isopyrum caespitosum. The type specimen was collected on 11 July, 1842, by the Austrian botanist and explorer Theodor Kotschy, with the type locality at an elevation of 3,500 m (11,500 ft) in the Alborz mountains of Mazandaran province in northern Iran. In a 1920 article for the Royal Botanic Gardens, Kew's Bulletin of Miscellaneous Information, the British botanists James Ramsay Drummond and John Hutchinson segragatated the genus Paraquilegia from Isopyrum and renamed the species Paraquilegia caespitosa.

=== Etymology ===
The genus name Paraquilegia means "next to" or "besides" Aquilegia (the genera of columbines). While the leaves of Paraquilegia and columbines may have similar appearances, the flowers of Paraquilegia are more similar to those of the genus Anemone. The word aquilegia itself may come from the Latin word for "eagle", aquila, in reference to the columbine's petals' resemblance to eagle talons. Aquilegia may also derive from aquam legere, which is Latin for "to collect water", or aquilegium, a Latin word for a container of water. The specific name caespitosa is Latin for "tufted".

== Distribution ==
The range of Paraquilegia caespitosa spans from northern Iran to Xinjiang in China and the western Himalayas. The Flora of China records the species's range including Afghanistan, Kashmir, Kyrgyzstan, Russia, and Tajikistan. The plant favors shady, gravelly slopes at elevations of approximately 2,900 m (9,500 ft) to 4,800 m (15,700 ft) above sea level, with occurrences occasionally as low as 2,500 m (8,200 ft) above sea level. Wild specimens have been noted in fissures and screes.

An erroneous description in the Flora Iranica suggested the species was endemic to Iran and attributed examples of what were likely P. carspitosa in the Hindu Kush and Pakistani mountains as Paraquilegia anemonoides. The presence of the species in Afghanistan was first confirmed with photographs of occurrences in rock crevices in the Hindu Kush, taken in the 1970s by Bob Gibbons.

== Cultivation ==
Rock gardeners have generally considered Paraquilegia a challenging genus to cultivate. According to botanist and gardener Christopher Grey-Wilson, the "basic requirement [for Paraquilegia] is very good drainage, a cool root run and part shade". While substantial quantities of Paraquilegia seeds have been acquired from the Himalayas and western China, relatively few plants have been successfully grown in cultivation.
