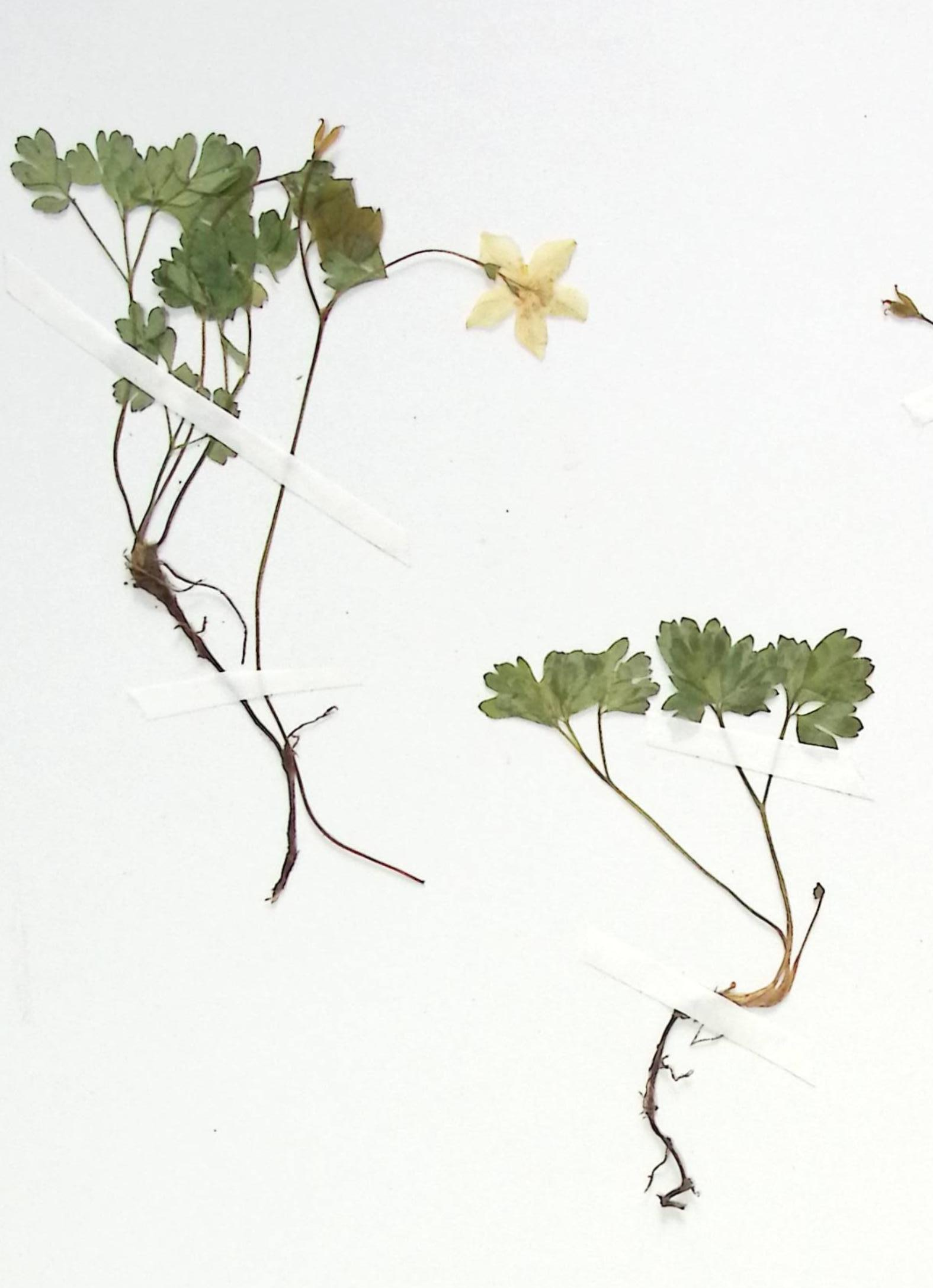
- Paropyrum anemonoides specimen from Tajikistan

Scientific classification
- Kingdom: Plantae
- Clade: Tracheophytes
- Clade: Angiosperms
- Clade: Eudicots
- Order: Ranunculales
- Family: Ranunculaceae
- Subfamily: Thalictroideae
- Genus: Paropyrum; Ulbr.
- Species: P. anemonoides

Binomial name
- Paropyrum anemonoides (Kar. & Kir.) Ulbr.

Synonyms
- Isopyrum anemonoides Kar. & Kir.; Paraquilegia anemonoides (Kar. & Kir.) Schipcz.; Paraquilegia kareliniana Nevski; Thalictrella anemonoides (Kar. & Kir.) E.Nardi

= Paropyrum =

Genus of flowering plants

Paropyrum is a monotypic genus of herbaceous perennial flowering plant in the subfamily Thalictroideae in the family Ranunculaceae. The sole species in the genus, Paropyrum anemonoides, has a native range that spans from Central Asia to North China and the western Himalayas. The plants can also be characterized as rhizomatous and geophytes. The stems grow 10 to 25 cm (3.9 to 9.8 in) tall. Paropyrum blooms with small white flowers possessing five sepals and five petals.

The species was initially described in 1842 as Isopyrum anemonoides by the Russian botanists Grigory Karelin and Ivan Petrovich Kirilov. This assignment to Isopyrum was challenged by later botanists and taxonomic revisions for more than 160 years. The species was segregated as the sole species within the genus Paropyrum by the German botanist Oskar Eberhard Ulbrich in 1925, but this placement was not widely accepted. Using genetic evidence and petal morphology, the Chinese botanists Wei Wang and Zhi-Duan Chen revived Ulbrich's Paropyrum and recognized it as a sister genus of Paraquilegia in 2007. This placement was supported by a family-wide taxonomic revision of Ranunculaceae in 2026.

== Description ==
Paropyrum anemonoides is the sole species of herbaceous perennial flowering plants within the monotypic genus Paropyrum, which is in the subfamily Thalictroideae in the family Ranunculaceae.

== Taxonomy ==
The species now known as Paropyrum anemonoides was first described in 1842 by the Russian botanists Grigory Karelin and Ivan Petrovich Kirilov in the Bulletin de la Société Impériale des Naturalistes de Moscou. The genus Paropyrum was first described in 1925 by the German botanist Oskar Eberhard Ulbrich in the Notizblatt des Botanischen Gartens und Museums zu Berlin-Dahlem.

=== Taxonomic history ===
Since the species was first described as Isopyrum anemonoides in 1842, there have been repeated revisions to the species's taxonomy. There has also been confusion regarding its synonymy with other names. The species now accepted as Paropyrum anemonoides has been considered part of the genera Isopyrum, Paraquilegia, and Thalictrella, with other names previously described as separate species now synonymized under the Paropyrum placement.

In 1920, the British botanists James Ramsay Drummond and John Hutchinson published an article, "A Revision of Isopyrum (Ranunculaceae) and Its Nearer Allies", in the Bulletin of Miscellaneous Information. They described a new genus, Paraquilegia, to contain species they deemed morphologically inconsistent with other Isopyrum species. They also identified Isopyrum uniflorum, as described by the British botanists James Edward Tierney Aitchison and William Hemsley in 1875, as a synonym for I. anemonoides. Drummond and Hutchinson moved this species to Paraquilegia, giving it the name Paraquilegia uniflora.

In 1811, the German botanist Carl Ludwig Willdenow described Aquilegia anemonoides. Drummond and Hutchinson moved this species to Paraquilegia with the name P. grandiflora in 1920. This name was corrected to Paraquilegia anemonoides by Ulbrich in 1922, its currently accepted name. However, in 1924, the Russian botanist Nikolai Schipczinsky also used the name Paraquilegia anemonoides in an effort to correct Paraquilegia uniflora to its earlier specific name. Ulbrich subsequently separated the plants initially described as I. uniflorum – retaining them under the name Paraquilegia anemonoides – from the plants initially described as I. anemonoides. He placed the latter plants within the new genus Paropyrum with the name Paropyrum anemonoides.

The botanists Minoru N. Tamura and L. A. Lauener accepted Ulbrich's separation of Paraquilegia anemonoides but considered Paropyrum a section of Isopyrum, accepting the species as I. anemonoides. This was contradicted in 1991 by the Pakistani botanist Yasin J. Nasir, who accepted the species as I. anemonoides but again considered I. uniflorum a synonym; this synonymization is not accepted.

The genus Paropyrum was resurrected by the Chinese botanists Wei Wang and Zhi-Duan Chen in 2007. Based on genetic analyses, they assessed the genus Isopyrum as heterogeneous when including I. anemonoides. Accepting Paropyrum, Wang and Chen placed it in a clade of the subfamily Thalictroideae with Paraquilegia and Leptopyrum, while other Isopyrum species were found to be in a separate clade.

== Distribution ==
Paropyrum favors high-elevation grassy slopes, gravelly soil, and rocky areas, often within forests.

Paropyrum often shares the same habitats within their native ranges common with Paraquilegia, resulting in Paropyrum often being mistaken for Paraquilegia.
