= Paraquilegia uniflora =

Scientific classification
- Kingdom: Plantae
- Clade: Tracheophytes
- Clade: Angiosperms
- Clade: Eudicots
- Order: Ranunculales
- Family: Ranunculaceae
- Genus: Paraquilegia
- Species: P. uniflora

Binomial name
- Paraquilegia uniflora (Aitch. & Hemsl.) J.R.Drumm. & Hutch.

Species of flowering plant

Paraquilegia uniflora is a species of perennial flowering plant in the family Ranunculaceae. Its range spans Tajikistan to the mountainous border between Afghanistan and northern Pakistan. It is a cushion plant with flowers that are blue or creamy white.

== Description ==
Paraquilegia uniflora is a species of perennial in the genus Paraquilegia in the family Ranunculaceae. The species is a cushion plant.

All flowers in the genus possess five sepals and five shorter yellow petals. The sepals on P. uniflora can be blue or creamy white. They are suborbicular to ovate in shape and range length between 7 mm (0.28 in) and 8 mm (0.31 in).

Seeds in the genus generally require at least two years to germinate, producing seedlings described by American botanist and gardener Robert Nold as "incredibly small and look exactly like columbines dancing on the head of a pin".

== Taxonomy ==
The species was first described as Isopyrum uniflorum by British botanists James Edward Tierney Aitchison and William Hemsley in 1882. In a 1920 article for the Royal Botanic Gardens, Kew's Bulletin of Miscellaneous Information, the British botanists James Ramsay Drummond and John Hutchinson segragatated the genus Paraquilegia from Isopyrum and renamed the species Paraquilegia uniflora.

The name of P. uniflora was in muddied when the Flora of the U.S.S.R. identified the species as Paraquilegia anemonoides, though that latter name had already been applied to another Paraquilegia species. The status of the species was resolved in the Flora Iranica, which established that P. uniflora is a distinct species.

=== Etymology ===
The genus name Paraquilegia means "next to" or "besides" Aquilegia (the genera of columbines). While the leaves of Paraquilegia and columbines may have similar appearances, the flowers of Paraquilegia are more similar to those of the genus Anemone. The word aquilegia itself may come from the Latin word for "eagle", aquila, in reference to the columbine's petals' resemblance to eagle talons. Aquilegia may also derive from aquam legere, which is Latin for "to collect water", or aquilegium, a Latin word for a container of water.

== Distribution ==
Paraquilegia uniflora is native to a range spanning Tajikistan to the mountainous border between Afghanistan and northern Pakistan.

== Conversation ==
As of 2025, the Royal Botanic Gardens, Kew's Plants of the World Online, utilizing the Angiosperm Extinction Risk Predictions v1, predicts that Paraquilegia uniflora is a "not threatened" species with a confidence level of "low confidence".
