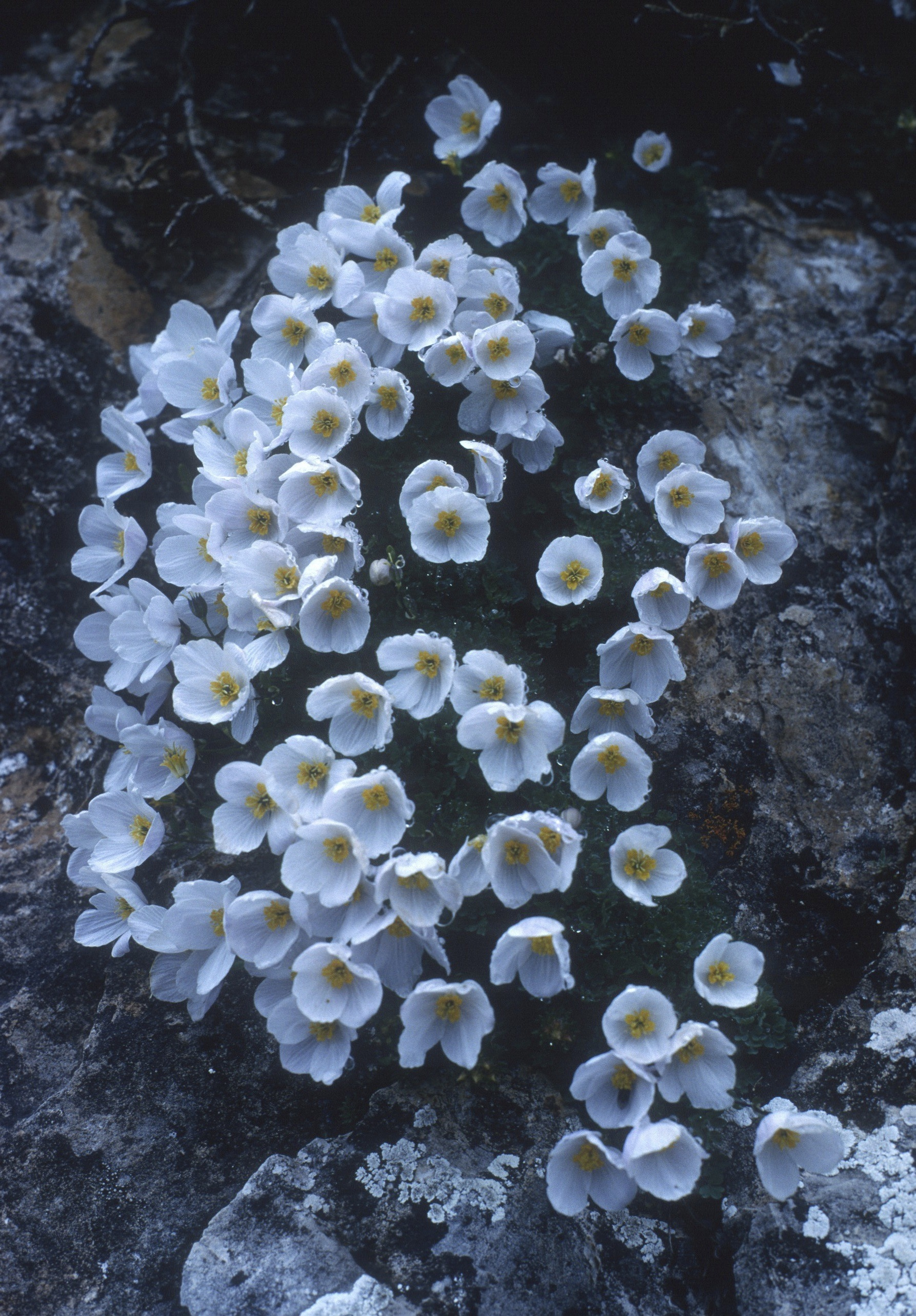
- Paraquilegia microphylla

Scientific classification
- Kingdom: Plantae
- Clade: Embryophytes
- Clade: Tracheophytes
- Clade: Angiosperms
- Clade: Eudicots
- Order: Ranunculales
- Family: Ranunculaceae
- Subfamily: Thalictroideae
- Genus: Paraquilegia; J.R.Drumm. & Hutch.

= Paraquilegia =

Genus of flowering plants

Paraquilegia is a genus of flowering plants belonging to the family Ranunculaceae. The genus was segregated out from the genus Isopyrum in 1920 by British botanists James Ramsay Drummond and John Hutchinson. The native range of the genus is temperate central Asia.

Despite the genus encompassing a relatively small number of taxa, there has been significant disagreement among taxonomic authorities regarding how many Paraquilegia species there are and what they are named.

In cultivation, Paraquilegia are grown by rock gardeners. The plants are notably difficult to grow. While significant quantities of seeds have entered the horticultural trade from the Himalayas and western China, relatively few plants have been successfully grown in cultivation. Seeds lose viability rapidly and can take years to germinate. Plants grown in clay pans and tufa have been noted as particularly successful.

== Description ==
Paraquilegia are a genus of perennial herbs in the family Ranunculaceae. They possess thick rhizomes. The plants' leaves are in a basal arrangement (growing out from the base of the stem).

Paraquilegia flowers generally appear in a solitary arrangement, though occasionally as pairs. The flowers range in shape from cup- to saucer-like. They are on narrow scapes. Each flowers generally have five sepals and five petals, though sepals can number between four and seven while petals can number up to ten.

Members of Paraquilegia possess flowers that present singly and can feature color. Each flower has nearly sessile nonpeltate petals with a degree of concaveness or swelling near their base. The plants' petals are yellow and are significantly smaller than their sepals.

Paraquilegia plants are hermaphrodites. Each flower has five to eight pistils. Fruiting plants have erect or partially spreading follicles. The seeds can have surfaces that range from smooth to densely wrinkled.

The surface texture of seeds in the genus can vary from wrinkled to smooth. As with other Ranunculaceae plants, these seeds lose viability rapidly. The seeds frequently require at least two years to germinate, producing small seedlings that were described as "columbines dancing on the head of a pin" by American botanist and gardener Robert Nold.

== Taxonomy ==
In 1920, British botanists James Ramsay Drummond and John Hutchinson published a paper, "A Revision of Isopyrum (Ranunculaceae) and Its Nearer Allies", in the Royal Botanic Gardens, Kew's Bulletin of Miscellaneous Information to address problems that had developed within the genus Isopyrum. Prior to their paper, the genus had permitted substantial morphological variance to coexist with certain species demonstrating greater affinities towards the genus Aquilegia (columbines). Part of the pair's proposed resolution was creating Paraquilegia and expanding the genus Semiaquilegia.

In proposing Paraquilegia, Drummond and Hutchinson sought to segregate Central Asian Isopyrum with features similar to those of Aquilegia. The pair identified one such feature as the mature follicles on Isopyrum grandiflorum (which the pair renamed Paraquilegia grandiflora and now called Paraquilegia anemonoides) and its allies. Their 1920 paper considered Paraquilegia to have the most "primitive" (basal) features compared to related genera. Drummond and Hutchinson proposed that the genera of Semiaquilegia and Isopyrum evolved from Paraquilegia and that Aquilegia processed out from Semiaquilegia.

== Distribution ==
Paraquilegia is found across Asia. Contrary to what the genus's name suggests, Paraquilegia is more closely related to several Ranunculaceae genera native to Asia other than Aquilegia. These include Leptopyrum, Urophysa, and Isopyrum. Isopyrum anemonoides occurs in similar locations throughout Paraquilegia's range, leading to the species being confused for Paraquilegia.

== Cultivation ==
The genus is known as difficult to cultivate. Grown by rock gardeners, the genus is known to require specific conditions, such as north-facing crevice gardens. According to Nold, "the most notable thing" about the genus was how "serious rock gardeners" spoke of the Paraquilegia, in "hushed and awed voices". He compared Paraquilegia's "aristocratic demeanor and tendency to sulk" to Aquilegia jonesii. Nold noted in 2003 that seeds were available from private seed lists produced by "expeditions to the remote – and potentially dangerous – locations that are the haunts" of Paraquilegia.

In 2023, the British botanist Christopher Grey-Wilson reported that substantial amounts of Paraquilegia seeds had entered circulation for cultivation from the Himalayas and western China, though the success rate with these seeds was low. Grey-Wilson noted that members of the Alpine Garden Society, the Scottish Rock Garden Club, and other growers had recently achieved success in cultivating Paraquilegia. According to Grey-Wilson, sufficient drainage, a cool root run, and partial shade were a fundamental requirements for successfully growing the genus.

Upon ripening, seeds must been sown immediately, with viability rapidly degrading over time. Cuttings have worked, but are difficult and can endanger the plant. Some of the most successful Paraquilegia plants in cultivation were grown in clay pans or tufa (a calcium carbonate soil). Clay pots can be used with compost, though this often results in the cushions and tufts on juvenile plants developing more slowly than wild examples.

== Species ==
A number of species have been assessed as under the genus Paraquilegia, either as new species or reassessment from other genera. As of 2025, the Royal Botanic Gardens, Kew's Plants of the World Online recognizes eight species:

- Paraquilegia altimurana Rech.f.
- Paraquilegia anemonoides (Willd.) Ulbr.
- Paraquilegia caespitosa (Boiss. & Hohen.) J.R.Drumm. & Hutch.
- Paraquilegia chionophila Gilli
- Paraquilegia gangotriana Pusalkar & D.K.Singh
- Paraquilegia microphylla (Royle) J.R.Drumm. & Hutch.
- Paraquilegia scabrifolia Pachom.
- Paraquilegia uniflora (Aitch. & Hemsl.) J.R.Drumm. & Hutch.
