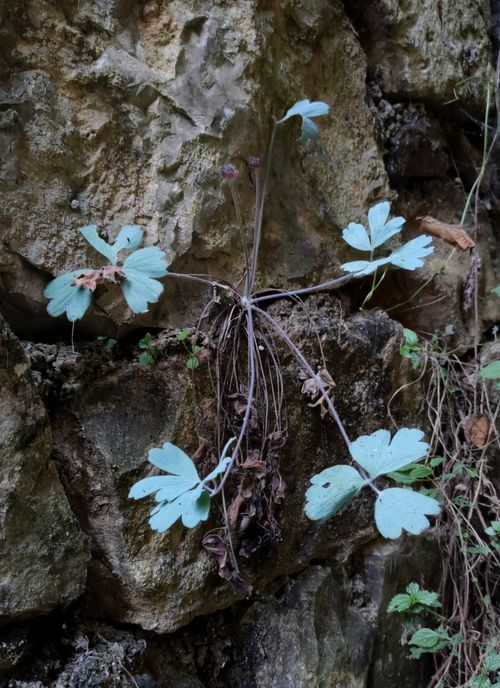
- Urophysa henryi growing in a rock crevice in Guizhou

Scientific classification
- Kingdom: Plantae
- Clade: Tracheophytes
- Clade: Angiosperms
- Clade: Eudicots
- Order: Ranunculales
- Family: Ranunculaceae
- Genus: Urophysa
- Species: U. henryi

Binomial name
- Urophysa henryi (Oliv.) Ulbr.

Synonyms
- Aquilegia henryi (Oliv.) Finet & Gagnep.; Isopyrum henryi Oliv.; Semiaquilegia henryi (Oliv.) J.R.Drumm. & Hutch.; Anemone boissiaei H.Lév. & Vaniot; Isopyrum boissieui Ulbr.

= Urophysa henryi =

Species of flowering plant

Urophysa henryi is a perennial flowering plant in the family Ranunculaceae, endemic to southern China.

== Description ==
Urophysa henryi is a perennial herb. It produces approximately eight leaves, sparsely covered in fine downy hairs and measuring 3–4.5 cm (1.2–1.8 in) in length. The leaf stalks are 3.6–12 cm (1.4–4.7 in) long. The leaves consist of three oblique fan-shaped leaflets, the side leaflets having two unequal lobes each, and the central leaflet being slightly smaller with three lobes and sometimes a short stalk. The inflorescences measure around 5 cm (2 in) long and produce three flowers, which are 2–2.5 cm (0.8–1.0 in) in diameter and have stalks of 1.5–7 cm (0.6–2.8 in). The sepals are blue to pinkish-white, oval-shaped and 0.5–7 cm (0.2–2.8 in) long, with a smooth upper and downy lower surface. The petals are around 5 mm long, boat-shaped and lacking a nectar spur. The stamens measure 3.5–9 mm in length and the staminodes 2.5–3.5 mm.

== Taxonomy ==
The species was initially described by Daniel Oliver in 1888 as Isopyrum henryi. It was variously reassigned to the genera Aquilegia (by Achille Eugène Finet and François Gagnepain in 1904) and Semiaquilegia (by James Ramsay Drummond and John Hutchinson in 1920) before its now-accepted classification as a new genus Urophysa by Oskar Eberhard Ulbrich in 1929.

=== Etymology ===
The specific epithet henryi honours the Irish botanist Augustine Henry, who collected the type specimen from the vicinity of Liantuo village near Yichang, Hubei Province, China.

== Distribution and habitat ==
Urophysa henryi is native to Guizhou, western Hubei, northwestern Hunan, and Sichuan provinces in China. It grows on cliffs and in fissures in rocks in karst landscapes.

== Conservation ==
As of December 2024, the species has not been assessed for the IUCN Red List.

== Ecology ==
Urophysa henryi flowers from March to April.

== Uses ==
The plant is used in traditional Chinese medicine to treat bruises.
