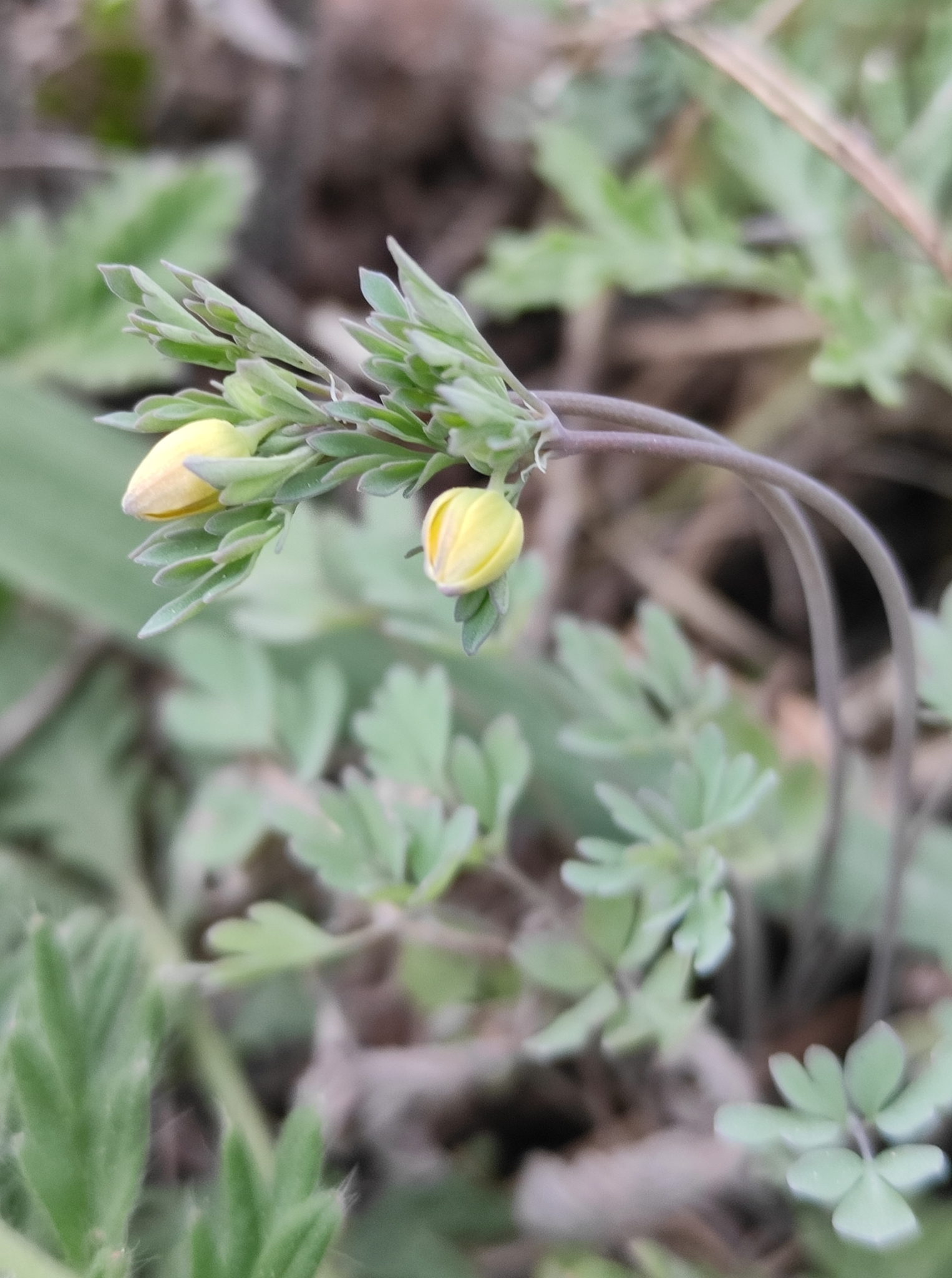
- Leptopyrum fumarioides

Scientific classification
- Kingdom: Plantae
- Clade: Embryophytes
- Clade: Tracheophytes
- Clade: Angiosperms
- Clade: Eudicots
- Order: Ranunculales
- Family: Ranunculaceae
- Subfamily: Thalictroideae
- Genus: Leptopyrum; Rchb.
- Species: L. fumarioides

Binomial name
- Leptopyrum fumarioides (L.) Rchb.

Synonyms
- Helleborus fumarioides (L.) Lam.; Isopyrum fumarioides L.; Isopyrum fumariifolium Salisb.; Leptopyrum generale E.H.L.Krause

= Leptopyrum =

Genus of flowering plants

Leptopyrum is a monotypic genus of flowering plants belonging to the family Ranunculaceae. The only species is Leptopyrum fumarioides, native to north and east Asia.

== Description ==
=== Morphology ===
Leptopyrum fumarioides is an annual herbaceous plant growing to 8–30 cm (3–12 in) tall, with 4–9 (rarely as few as 2 or as many as 17) smooth, sparsely branched stems. The leaves are triangular-ovate and have stalks of 2.5–13 cm (1–5 in) length. The leaflets are rhombic in shape, with the central leaflet having a short stalk, and each leaflet divided into three unequal, narrow, teardrop-shaped lobes. The leaflet edges may be smooth or have small teeth. The flowers measure 3–5 mm in diameter with oval yellowish sepals 3–4.5 mm long and smooth petals 1 mm long. The stamens are around 3 mm in length and the anthers around 0.5 mm.

=== Phytochemistry ===
The previously unknown alkaloids leptopyrine and leptofumarine were isolated from the above-ground parts of the plant, as well as the known alkaloids protopine and thalifoline.

== Taxonomy ==
=== Taxonomic history ===
The species was initially described in the genus Isopyrum, as I. fumarioides, by Carl Linnaeus in 1753. Jean-Baptiste Lamarck disagreed with the attribution to Isopyrum and instead classified the plant in 1789 as a hellebore, Helleborus fumarioides. In 1807, Richard Anthony Salisbury followed Linnaeus in assigning the plant to Isopyrum but renamed the species as I. fumariifolium (meaning "with leaves like fumitory"). Ludwig Reichenbach coined the now-accepted genus name Leptopyrum in 1828.

=== Phylogeny ===
Within the subfamily Thalictroideae, genetic analyses suggest Leptopyrum fumarioides forms a group with the genera Thalictrum, Paropyrum (a monotypic genus containing Paropyrum anemonoides, separated to resolve the polyphyly of Isopyrum), and Paraquilegia. Within this group, Leptopyrum forms a sister clade to the other three genera. Leptopyrum appears to have split from the other genera around 15.3 million years ago, in the mid-Miocene epoch.

=== Etymology ===
The generic name Leptopyrum means "slender grain" (referring to the fruits), while the specific epithet fumarioides means "resembling Fumaria" (fumitory or fumewort).

== Distribution and habitat ==
Leptopyrum fumarioides is native to Russia (Siberia, Amur Oblast, and Khabarovsk Krai), Kazakhstan, China (Gansu, Hebei, Heilongjiang, Jilin, Liaoning, Inner Mongolia, Qinghai, Shaanxi, Shanxi, and Xinjiang), Korea, and Mongolia. It grows in forest margins, in grassy places, and by fields, at altitudes of 100–1,400 m (330–4,590 ft).

== Conservation ==
As of December 2024, the genus has not been assessed for the IUCN Red List.

== Ecology ==
Leptopyrum fumarioides flowers between May and July, and fruits between June and July.

=== Pests and diseases ===
The fungi Puccinia actaeae-agropyri and Sphaeropsis isopyri are known parasites of the species, forming pustules and spots on the leaves respectively.

== Uses ==
Leptopyrum fumarioides has been used in traditional medicine in Mongolia and Tibet to treat fever, typhoid fever, increased blood pressure, liver, cardiovascular and gastrointestinal diseases, edema, and for treatment of various intoxications. Chemicals in the plant have been found to protect DNA from damage from catechol, probably by acting as potent antioxidants.
