= Enemion stipitatum =

Scientific classification
- Kingdom: Plantae
- Clade: Tracheophytes
- Clade: Angiosperms
- Clade: Eudicots
- Order: Ranunculales
- Family: Ranunculaceae
- Genus: Enemion
- Species: E. stipitatum

Binomial name
- Enemion stipitatum (A.Gray) J.R.Drumm. & Hutch.

Synonyms
- Isopyrum stipitatum A.Gray

Species of flowering plant

Enemion stipitatum (syn. Isopyrum stipitatum) is a species of flowering plant in the buttercup family known by the common name Siskiyou false rue anemone. It is native to northern California and southern Oregon where it grows in forest, woodland, and chaparral habitats in the local mountain ranges. This is a petite perennial herb producing one or more erect, unbranched stems to a maximum height no more than 15 centimeters. Leaves appear toward the top of each stem in arrays of several cloverlike leaves with three-lobed leaflets. The tiny solitary flowers each have five white petallike sepals only a few millimeters long. The center of the flower contains several thick white stamens topped with small yellow anthers and 3 to 5 styles.
