= Urophysa rockii =

Scientific classification
- Kingdom: Plantae
- Clade: Tracheophytes
- Clade: Angiosperms
- Clade: Eudicots
- Order: Ranunculales
- Family: Ranunculaceae
- Genus: Urophysa
- Species: U. rockii

Binomial name
- Urophysa rockii Ulbr.

Synonyms
- Semiaquilegia rockii (Ulbr.) Hutch.

Species of flowering plant

Urophysa rockii is a perennial flowering plant in the family Ranunculaceae, endemic to Sichuan in China.

== Description ==
Urophysa rockii is a perennial herb. It produces approximately ten leaves, sparsely covered in fine downy hairs and measuring 2.6–7 cm (1.0–2.8 in) in length. The leaf stalks are 8.5–14 cm (3.3–5.5 in) long. The leaves consist of three oblique fan-shaped leaflets, the side leaflets having two unequal lobes each, and the central leaflet being slightly smaller with three lobes and sometimes a short stalk. The inflorescences usually produce only a single flower on a stalk 4.5–10 mm long. The sepals are blue, oval-shaped and 2 cm (0.79 in) long, with a smooth upper and sparsely downy lower surface. The petals are around 6 mm long, boat-shaped and having a nectar spur around 2 mm long. The stamens are smooth and measure 8–10 mm in length, and the staminodes are lance-shaped and the same length as the petals.

== Taxonomy ==
Urophysa rockii was formally described by Oskar Eberhard Ulbrich in the new genus Urophysa in 1929. Although John Hutchinson reclassified it in the genus Semiaquilegia in 1935, it is now accepted as Urophysa.

== Distribution and habitat ==
Urophysa rocki is endemic to northern Sichuan province in China, along the upper reaches of the Fu River. It grows in wet places by streams.

== Conservation ==
As of December 2024, the species has not been assessed for the IUCN Red List.

== Ecology ==
Urophysa rockii flowers from March to April, and fruits in April.
