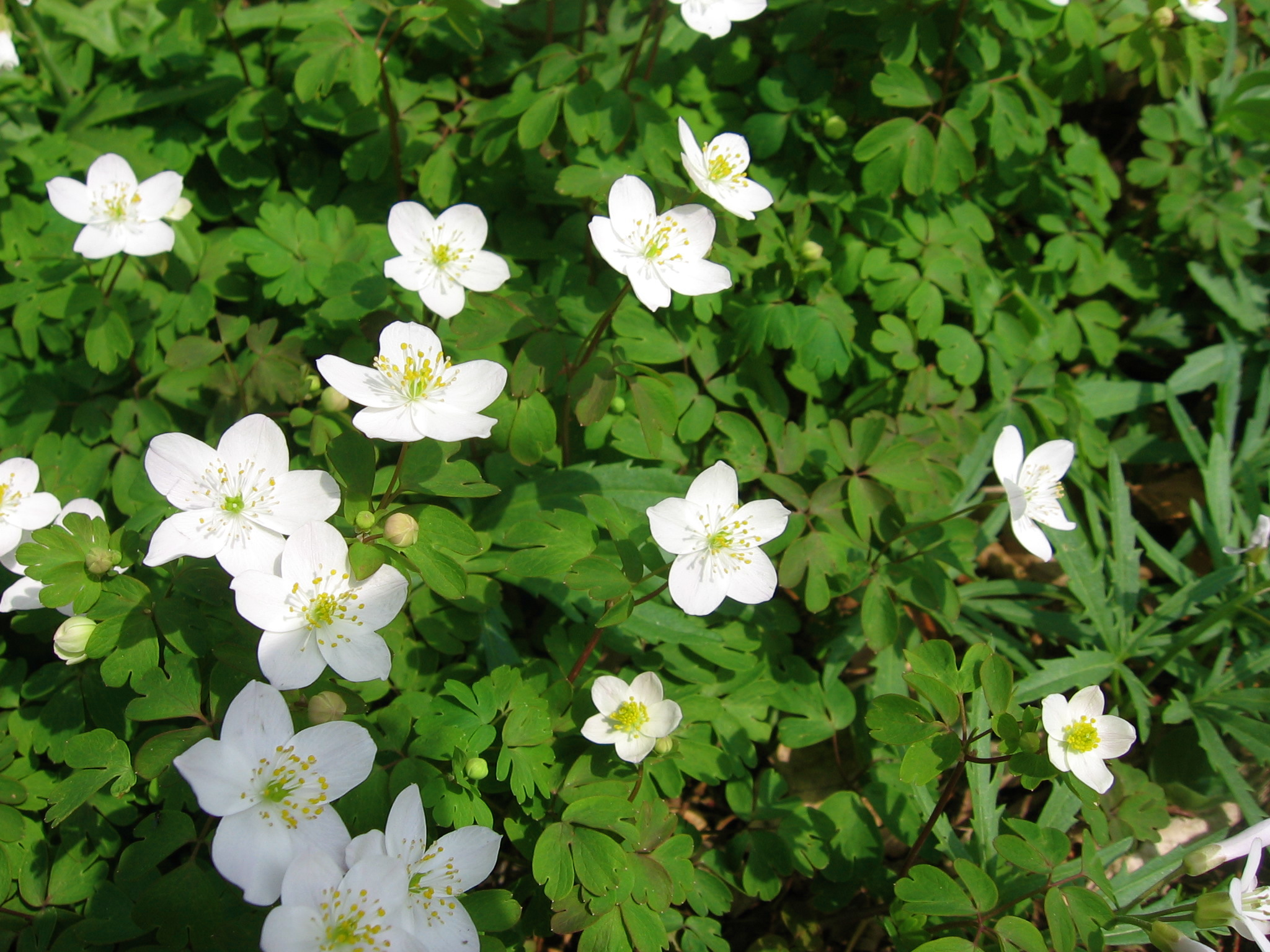
- Enemion biternatum, the false rue-anemone

Scientific classification
- Kingdom: Plantae
- Clade: Embryophytes
- Clade: Tracheophytes
- Clade: Spermatophytes
- Clade: Angiosperms
- Clade: Eudicots
- Order: Ranunculales
- Family: Ranunculaceae
- Subfamily: Thalictroideae
- Genus: Enemion; Raf.

Species
- Enemion biternatum; Enemion hallii; Enemion occidentale; Enemion savilei; Enemion stipitatum

= Enemion =

False rue anemones

Genus of flowering plants

Enemion (false rue-anemone) are spring ephemerals with white flowers, branching stems, and finely divided leaves in the buttercup family. One species, Enemion biternatum, is native to eastern and central North America, while Enemion occidentale, stipitatum, hallii, and savilei are native to the West Coast of the United States and Canada. The genus Isopyrum is similar, and has species native to Europe and Asia.

Enemion comes from Ancient Greek ἠνέμιον (ēnémion), another word for ἀνεμώνη "anemone".
