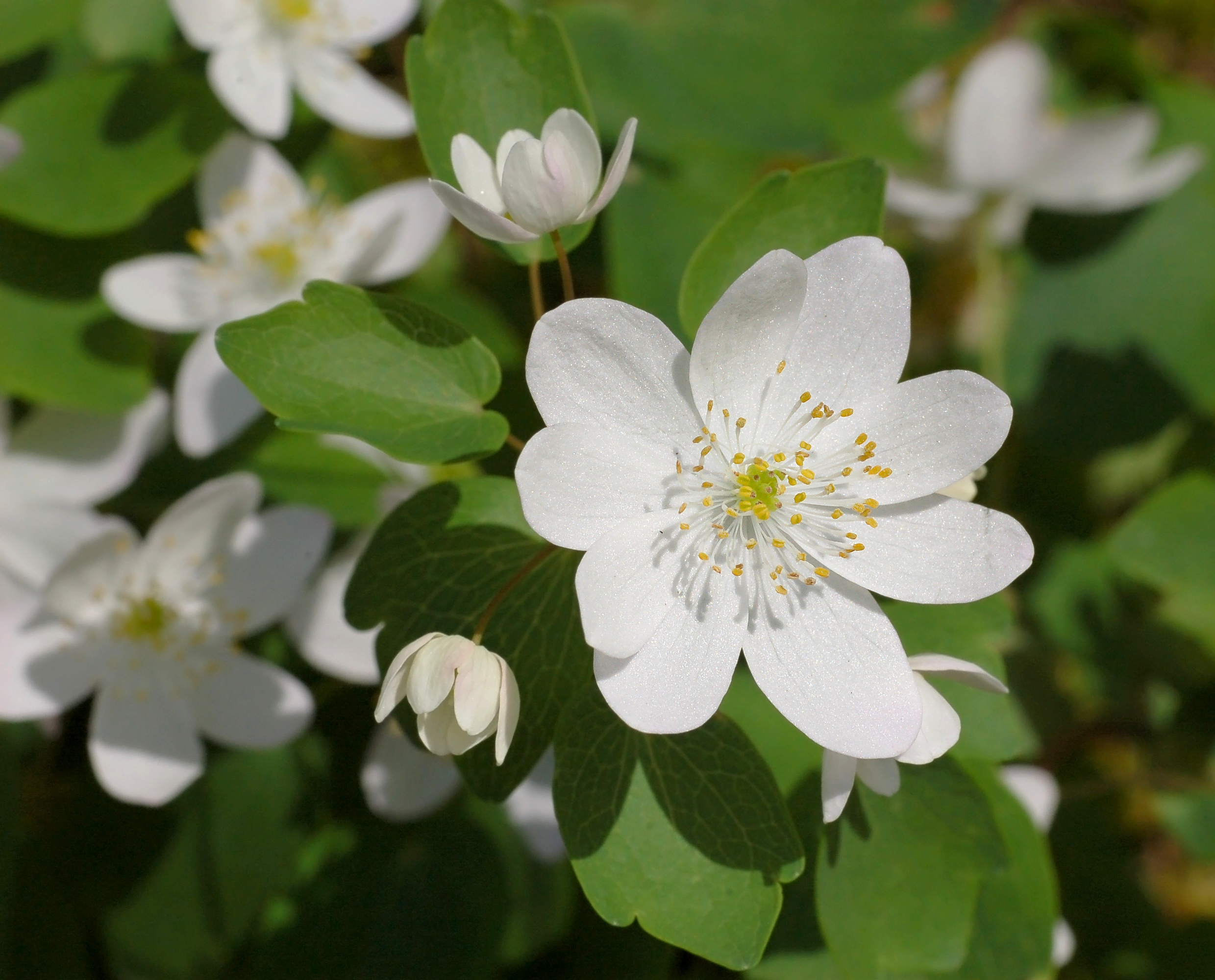

Conservation status
- Secure (NatureServe)

Scientific classification
- Kingdom: Plantae
- Clade: Tracheophytes
- Clade: Angiosperms
- Clade: Eudicots
- Order: Ranunculales
- Family: Ranunculaceae
- Genus: Thalictrum
- Species: T. thalictroides

Binomial name
- Thalictrum thalictroides (L.) A.J.Eames & B. Boivin

Synonyms
- Anemone thalictroides L.; Anemonella thalictroides (L.) Spach

= Thalictrum thalictroides =

Species of flowering plant

Thalictrum thalictroides (syn. Anemonella thalictroides), the rue-anemone or windflower, is a herbaceous perennial plant native to woodland in eastern North America. It has white or pink flowers surrounded by a whorl of leaflets, and it blooms in spring.

== Description ==
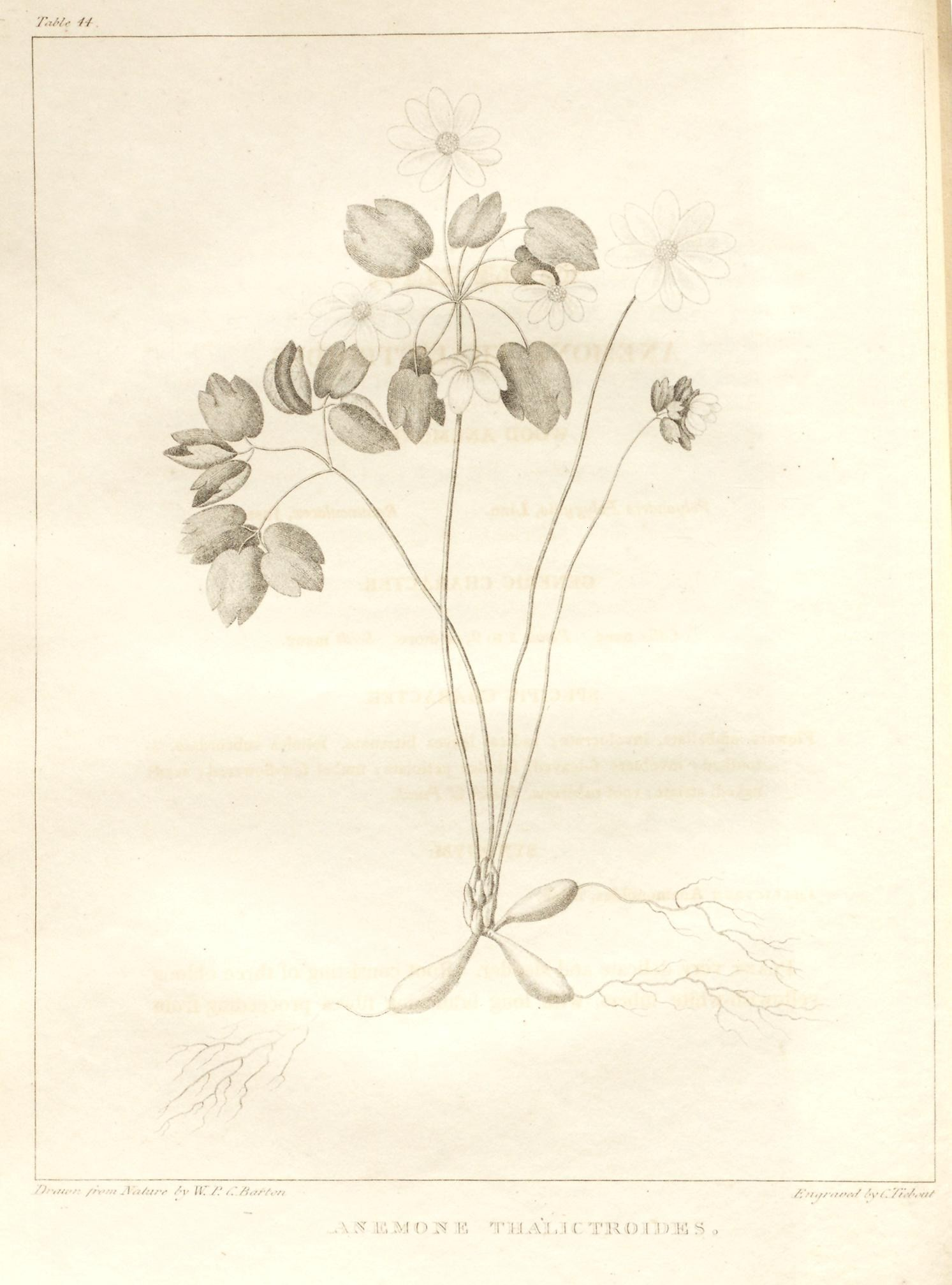
A flora of North America (Table 44) (7361638674)

Thalictrum thalictroides is a hairless plant growing from a cluster of tuberous roots, with upright stems 10 to 30 cm (4 to 12 in) tall that end with flowers. The basal leaves have petioles (leaf stalks) 10–30 cm (4–12 in) long and leaf blades that are two times ternately compound. The leaflets are widely rounded in shape and the ends are three lobed.

It flowers in spring, with flowers are borne singly or in umbel-like inflorescences with 3 to 6 flowers. The flowers have short stems that hold the fully opened flowers above the foliage. The involucral bracts have three leaflets like the leaves. The showy rounded flowers have 4-15 carpels surrounded by many yellow stamens in the middle, and a cup of 5 to 10 white to pinkish-lilac petal-like sepals. The sepals are about 5 to 18 mm (3/16 to 11/16 in) long and the filaments 3–4 mm (1/8–3/16 in) long.

In late spring, 3 to 4.5 mm (1/8 to 3/16 in) long, ovoid to fusiform shaped fruits called achenes are released. The green achenes have 8 to 10 prominent veins and become dark brown when ripe.

The Latin specific epithet thalictroides is in reference to the plant's leaves that look similar to meadow rue.

== Taxonomy ==
Originally described as Anemone thalictroides by Linnaeus in 1753, it was transferred to a new, monospecific genus, Anemonella, by Édouard Spach in 1839. Although similar to plants in the genus Thalictrum, Sprach considered the diminutive size, umbelliform inflorescence, and tuberous roots of this species to be distinctive enough to designate a new genus. Bernard Boivin considered this distinction suspect, and transferred the species to the genus Thalictrum in 1957. Molecular evidence supports the placement of the species within Thalictrum, and this placement is accepted by several modern treatments, although The Plant List retains it in Anemonella.

== Distribution and habitat ==
It typically inhabits banks and thickets in low-lying deciduous woodland, at 0–300 m (0–984 ft). Distribution is mainly in the north eastern United States, and Ontario in Canada.

== Similar species ==
The rue-anemone is often confused with the similar species, the false rue-anemone (Enemion biternatum). Both plants have white flowers that appear in early spring and grow in wooded areas. However, the false rue-anemone is more likely to be found in moist bottomlands and can form large colonies, while the rue-anemone grows singly on wooded slopes. Sometimes rue-anemone sepals are pale to dark pink, whereas false rue-anemone sepals are always white. The false rue-anemone holds its flowers in leaf axils, most often singly. In contrast, the flowers of a rue-anemone appear in a cluster above a whorl of leaf-like bracts, most often in groups of three to six. While false rue-anemones always have five sepals, rue-anemones can have five to ten sepals. False rue-anemones have a small cluster of no more than six green carpels in the center of the flower, while rue-anemones sometimes have as many as fifteen. False rue-anemones usually have deep clefts in their leaves, while rue-anemones do not.
