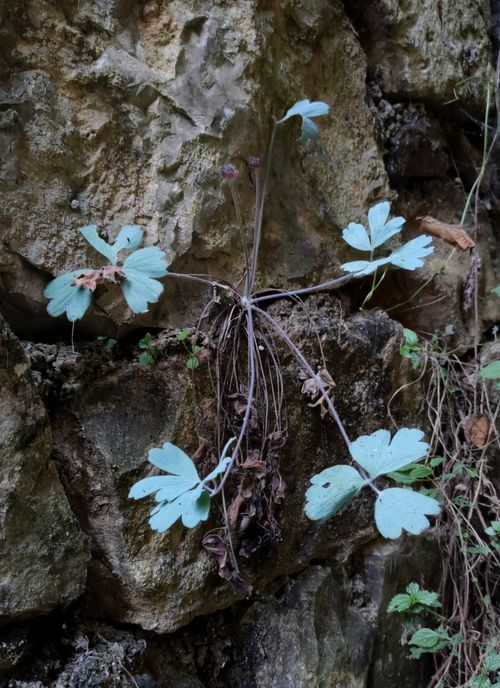
- Urophysa henryi

Scientific classification
- Kingdom: Plantae
- Clade: Embryophytes
- Clade: Tracheophytes
- Clade: Spermatophytes
- Clade: Angiosperms
- Clade: Eudicots
- Order: Ranunculales
- Family: Ranunculaceae
- Subfamily: Thalictroideae
- Genus: Urophysa; Ulbr.

= Urophysa =

Genus of flowering plants

Urophysa is a genus of perennial flowering plants belonging to the family Ranunculaceae, endemic to China.

== Description ==
Urophysa are perennial herbaceous plants with robust, more or less woody rhizomes. The basal leaves have three leaflets with long stalks which have a sheath at the base. The plants usually produce several scapes. The inflorescences form umbels with 1–3 flowers, each with five blue (or sometimes pinkish-white in U. henryi) sepals and five petals. The petals have either a small sac or a short, hooked nectar spur at the base. The flowers have smooth stamens, ellipsoid anthers, and around seven staminodes. The seeds are densely wrinkled.

== Taxonomy ==
=== Taxonomical history ===
The genus Urophysa was named by the German botanist Oskar Eberhard Ulbrich in 1929. Ulbrich reclassified the plant previously named Semiaquilegia henryi and Isopyrum henryi as Urophysa henryi in this new genus, and also described another species, U. rockii, in the same paper.

=== Etymology ===
The genus name urophysa is derived from Greek οὐρά "tail" and φῦσα "bladder, swelling, inflated, bellows", referring to the small sacs (or short nectar spurs in the case of U. rockii) at the base of the petals.

=== Subdivision ===
Urophysa comprises two accepted species:

- Urophysa henryi (Oliv.) Ulbr.
- Urophysa rockii Ulbr.

== Distribution and habitat ==
Urophysa is endemic to southern China. Both species occur in Sichuan, while U. henryi is also native to Guizhou, western Hubei and northwestern Hunan provinces.

== Conservation ==
As of January 2025, neither species has been assessed for the IUCN Red List.

== Ecology ==
Both species of Urophysa flower from March to April.
