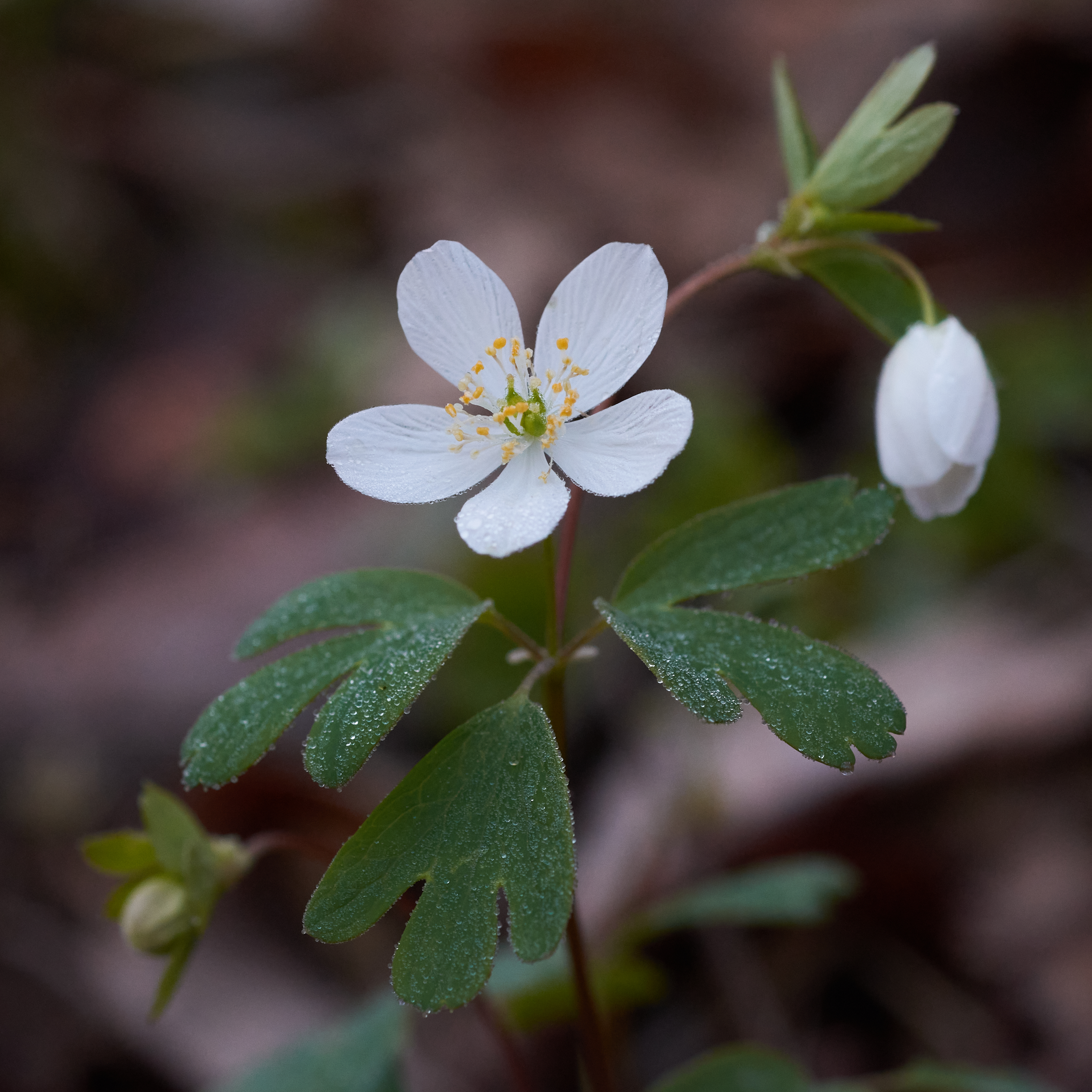

Conservation status
- Secure (NatureServe)

Scientific classification
- Kingdom: Plantae
- Clade: Tracheophytes
- Clade: Angiosperms
- Clade: Eudicots
- Order: Ranunculales
- Family: Ranunculaceae
- Genus: Enemion
- Species: E. biternatum

Binomial name
- Enemion biternatum Raf.

Synonyms
- Isopyrum biternatum (Rafinesque) Torrey & A. Gray

= Enemion biternatum =

Species of flowering plant

Enemion biternatum (syn. Isopyrum biternatum), commonly known as the false rue-anemone, is a spring ephemeral native to moist deciduous woodland in the eastern United States and extreme southern Ontario.

== Description ==
Enemion biternatum is a perennial herb. The plant sends up evergreen basal leaves in the fall, and flower stems in the spring. It goes dormant in late spring and early summer after the seed ripens.

Leaves are twice or thrice compound with groups of three leaflets. Leaflets are smooth-edged, irregularly and deeply lobed twice or thrice, often with one to three secondary shallow lobes. Basal leaves are held on long stalks, and there are leaves arranged alternately up the flowering stems, with shorter stalks. All stems are reddish and hairless.

The root system is weakly rhizomatous and occasionally produces small tubers. Plants spread over time to form thick colonies.

The flowering stems are 4 to 16 inches (10 to 40 cm) high. Flowers are produced singly or in leafy racemes of two to four flowers, which means that there are leaves arranged alternately up the stems and flowers are in stems that come out of leaf axils. On either side of the leaf axils are two rounded stipules.

The flowers have five white petal-like sepals that are each 5.5–13.5 mm (3/16–9/16 in) long and 3.5–8.5 mm (1/8–5/16 in) wide, 25-50 stamens with yellow pollen on the anthers, and three to six green carpels. If a carpel is fertilized, it develops into a beaked pod (follicle). When ripe, the pod splits open on one side to release several reddish-brown seeds.

Its habitats include floodplain woods, limestone ledges and rich or calcareous woods or thickets.

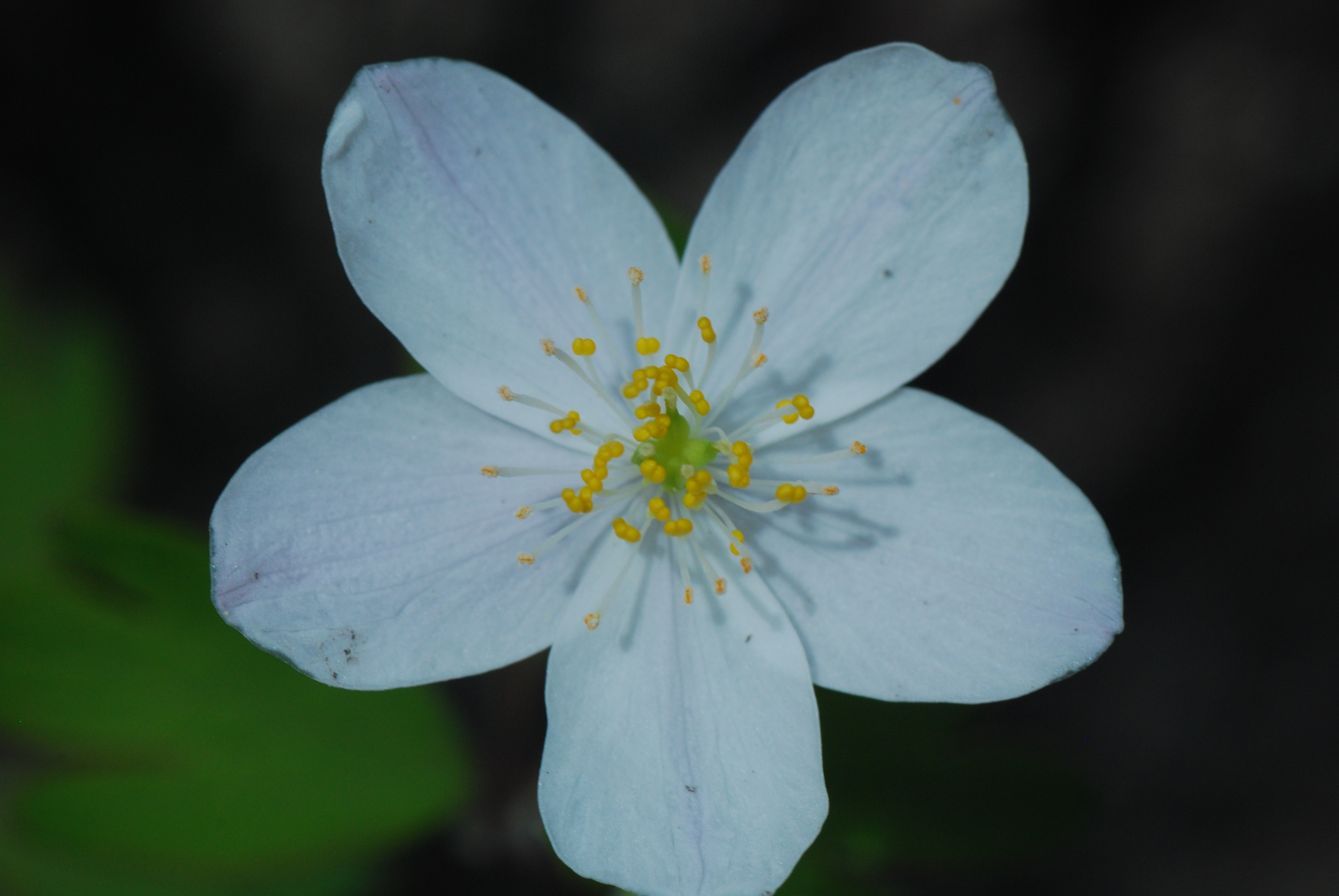
Closeup of a flower

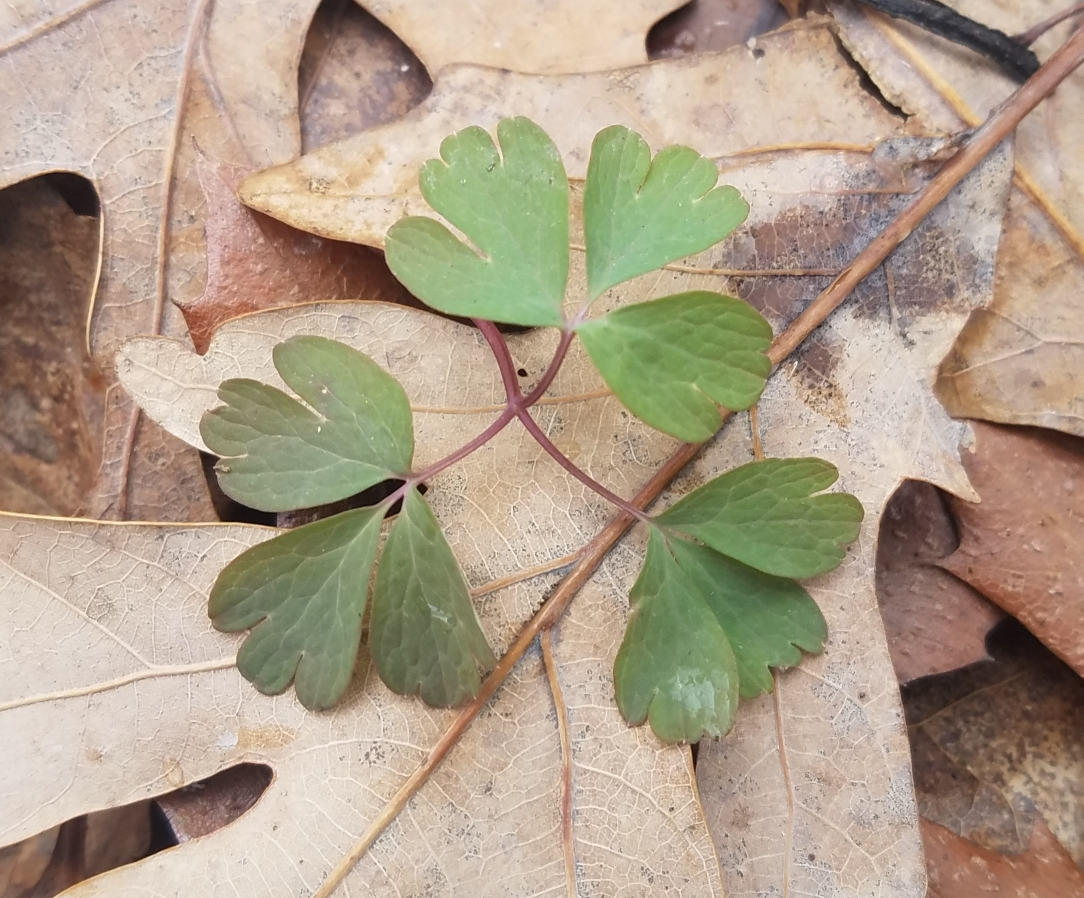
Twice three-parted ("biternate") leaf

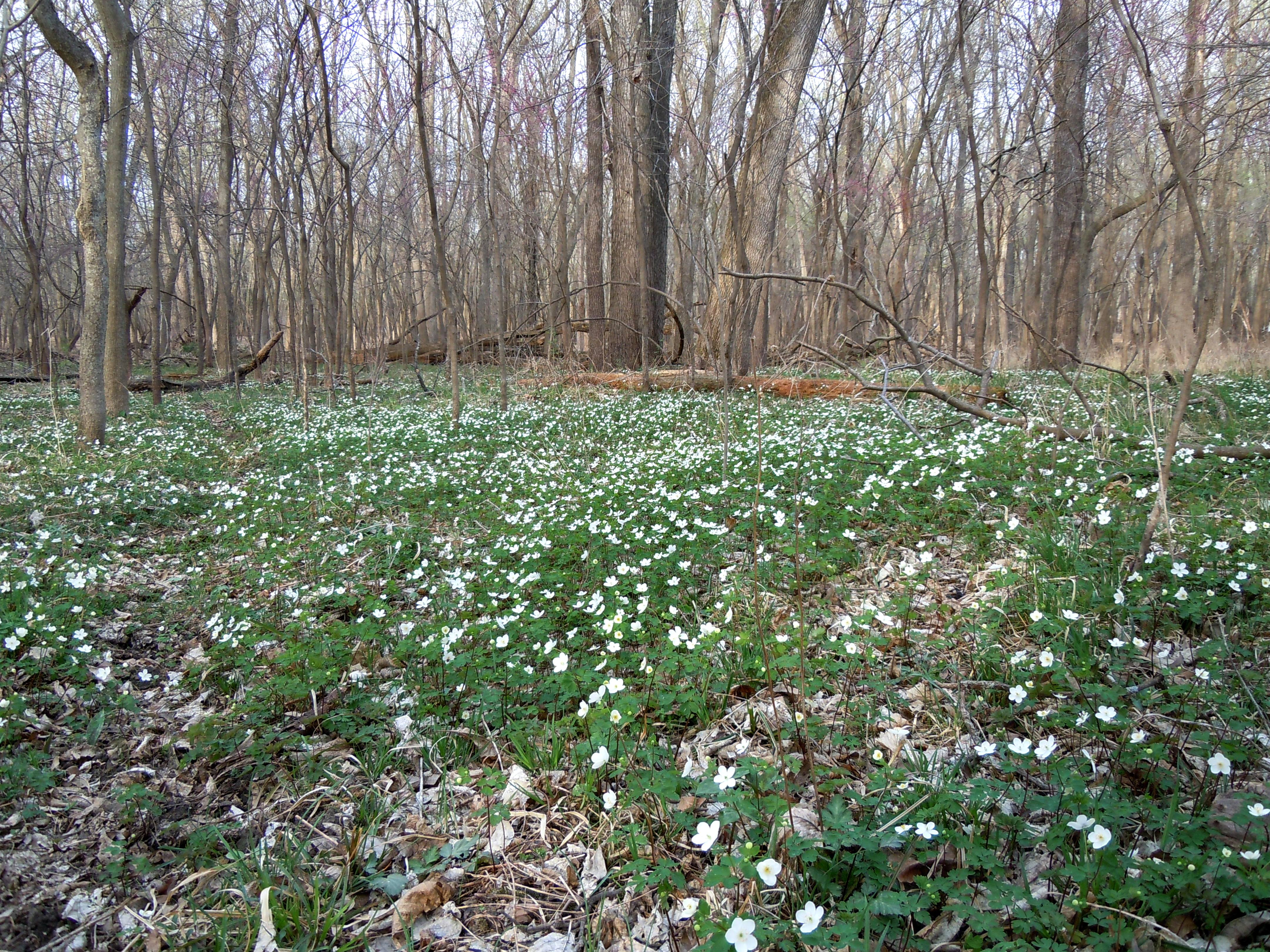
Carpet across the woodland floor

=== Similar species ===
The false rue-anemone is often confused with the similar species, the rue-anemone (Thalictrum thalictroides). Both plants have white flowers that appear in early spring and grow in wooded areas. However, the false rue-anemone is more likely to be found in moist bottomlands and can form large colonies, while the rue-anemone grows singly on wooded slopes. Sometimes rue-anemone sepals are pale to dark pink, whereas false rue-anemone sepals are always white. The false rue-anemone holds its flowers in leaf axils, most often singly. In contrast, the flowers of a rue-anemone appear in a cluster above a whorl of leaf-like bracts, most often in groups of three to six. While false rue-anemones always have five sepals, rue-anemones can have five to ten sepals. False rue-anemones have a small cluster of no more than six green carpels in the center of the flower, while rue-anemones sometimes have as many as fifteen. False rue-anemones usually have deep clefts in their leaflets, while rue-anemones do not.

== Ecology ==
The flowers produce pollen but no nectar. Small insects such as sweat bees (Lasioglossum and Halictus), mining bees (Andrena), honeybees (Apis mellifera), and hoverflies visit the flowers to collect or feed on pollen. Some bees likely visit searching in vain for nectar.

== Conservation ==
Enemion biternatum is listed as a schedule 1 threatened species in Canada, where only six populations were reported in southwestern Ontario. It is listed as an endangered species in Florida, where it has only been reported in Jackson and Washington counties.
