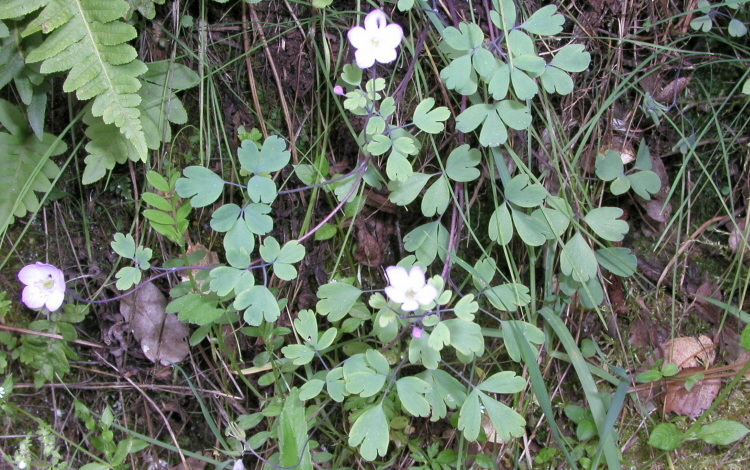

Scientific classification
- Kingdom: Plantae
- Clade: Tracheophytes
- Clade: Angiosperms
- Clade: Eudicots
- Order: Ranunculales
- Family: Ranunculaceae
- Genus: Enemion
- Species: E. occidentale

Binomial name
- Enemion occidentale (Hook. & Arn.) J.R.Drumm. & Hutch.

Synonyms
- Isopyrum occidentale Hook. & Arn.

= Enemion occidentale =

Species of flowering plant

Enemion occidentale (syn. Isopyrum occidentale) is a species of flowering plant in the buttercup family known by the common name western false rue anemone. It is found in California and rarely in Oregon where it is a resident of forest, woodland, and chaparral habitats in many of the mountain ranges. This is a small perennial herb producing one or more erect, unbranched stems growing to maximum heights near 25 centimeters. Leaves appear toward the top of the smooth, naked stems. Each green cloverlike leaf is divided into usually three irregular lobes. The solitary flowers are petite with white to very light lavender petallike sepals and no petals. At the center are white stamens with yellow anthers and white styles with yellow stigmas.
