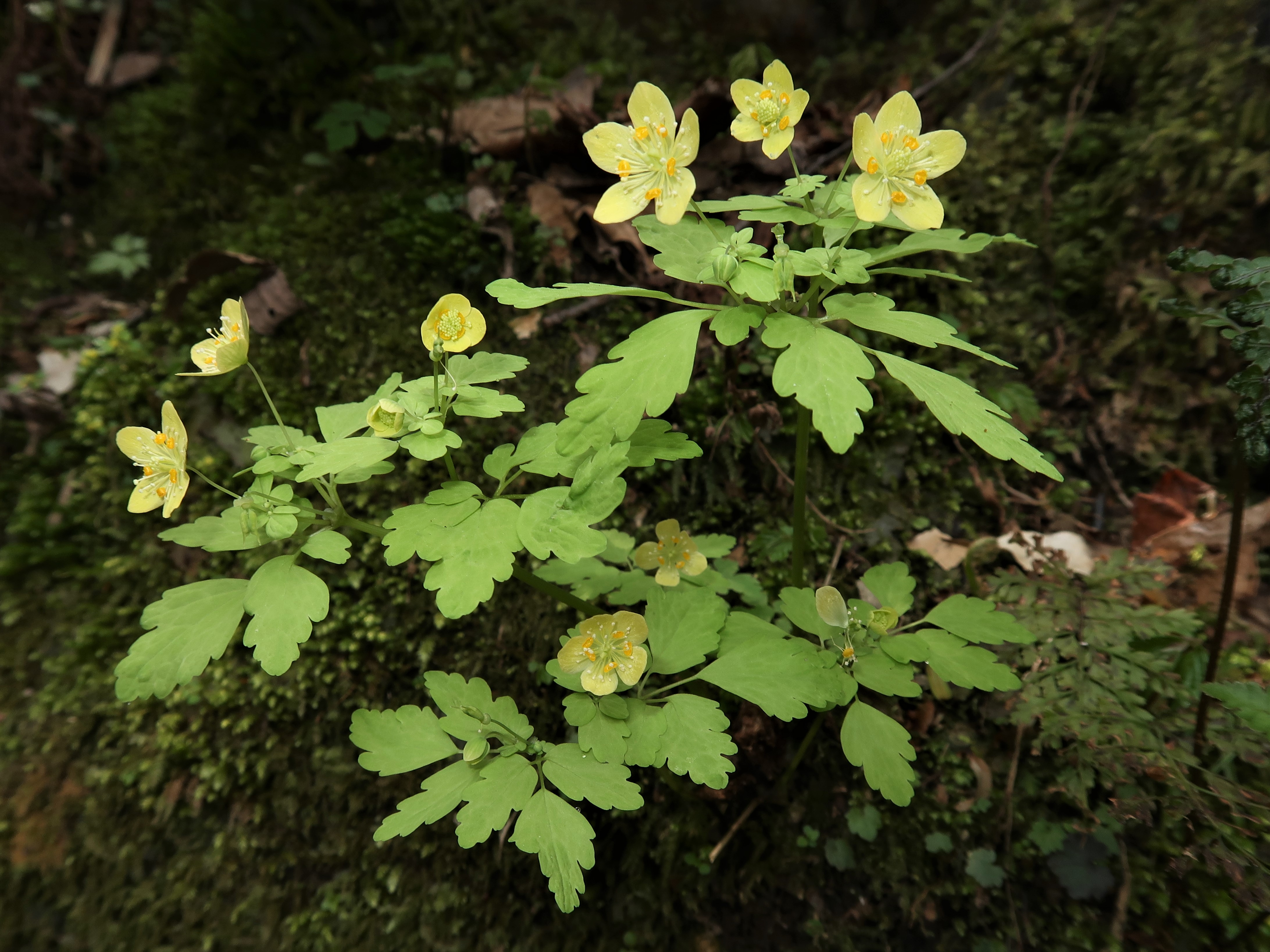
- Dichocarpum pterigionocaudatum

Scientific classification
- Kingdom: Plantae
- Clade: Embryophytes
- Clade: Tracheophytes
- Clade: Spermatophytes
- Clade: Angiosperms
- Clade: Eudicots
- Order: Ranunculales
- Family: Ranunculaceae
- Subfamily: Thalictroideae
- Genus: Dichocarpum; W.T.Wang & P.K.Hsiao

= Dichocarpum =

Genus of plants

Dichocarpum is a genus of flowering plants belonging to the family Ranunculaceae.

Its native range is Eastern Himalaya to Japan.

== Species ==
Species:

- Dichocarpum adiantifolium (Hook.f. & Thomson) W.T.Wang & P.K.Hsiao
- Dichocarpum arisanense (Hayata) W.T.Wang & P.K.Hsiao
- Dichocarpum auriculatum (Franch.) W.T.Wang & P.K.Hsiao
- Dichocarpum basilare W.T.Wang & P.K.Hsiao
- Dichocarpum carinatum D.Z.Fu
- Dichocarpum dalzielii (J.R.Drumm. & Hutch.) W.T.Wang & P.K.Hsiao
- Dichocarpum dicarpon (Miq.) W.T.Wang & P.K.Hsiao
- Dichocarpum fargesii (Franch.) W.T.Wang & P.K.Hsiao
- Dichocarpum franchetii (Finet & Gagnep.) W.T.Wang & P.K.Hsiao
- Dichocarpum hakonense (F.Maek. & Tuyama ex Ohwi) W.T.Wang & P.K.Hsiao
- Dichocarpum hypoglaucum W.T.Wang & P.K.Hsiao
- Dichocarpum nipponicum (Franch.) W.T.Wang & P.K.Hsiao
- Dichocarpum numajirianum (Makino) W.T.Wang & P.K.Hsiao
- Dichocarpum stoloniferum (Maxim.) W.T.Wang & P.K.Hsiao
- Dichocarpum sutchuenense (Franch.) W.T.Wang & P.K.Hsiao
- Dichocarpum trachyspermum (Maxim.) W.T.Wang & P.K.Hsiao
- Dichocarpum trifoliolatum W.T.Wang & P.K.Hsiao
- Dichocarpum wuchuanense S.Z.He
