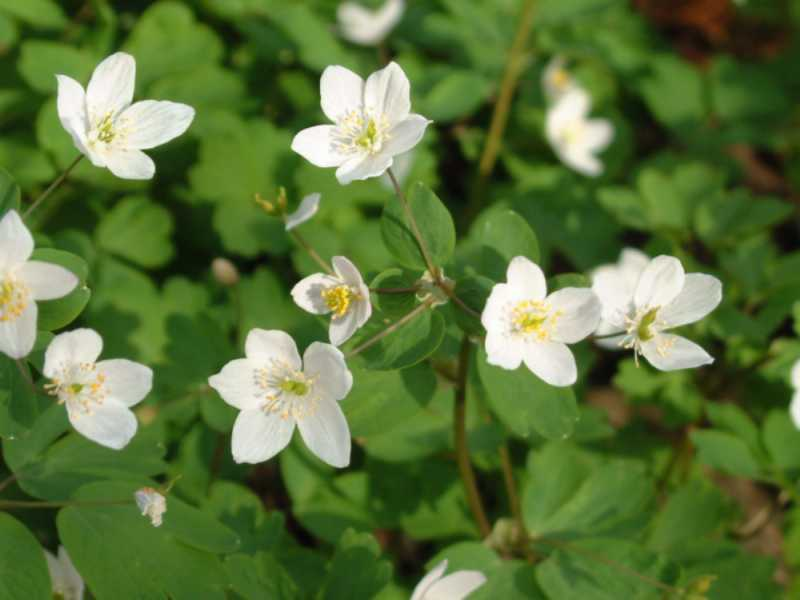

Scientific classification
- Kingdom: Plantae
- Clade: Tracheophytes
- Clade: Angiosperms
- Clade: Eudicots
- Order: Ranunculales
- Family: Ranunculaceae
- Genus: Isopyrum
- Species: I. thalictroides

Binomial name
- Isopyrum thalictroides L.

= Isopyrum thalictroides =

Species of flowering plant

Isopyrum thalictroides is a species of flowering plant belonging to the family Ranunculaceae.

Its native range is Europe.
