= Minoru N. Tamura =

Minoru N Tamura
- Occupation: Botanist
- Known for: Systematics and Evolutionary Botany, Liliaceae
- Scientific career
- Author abbrev. (botany): M.N.Tamura

Minoru N. Tamura is a Japanese botanist at the Botanical Garden of the City University, Osaka. Tamura is a specialist in the taxonomy of the family Liliaceae who has significantly contributed to the "Flora of China" and the "Flora of Thailand".

Tamura's system of classification of the Liliaceae in 1998 was a significant step in the modern understanding of this family.

== Publications ==
- Minoru N. Tamura, Shingchi Chen, Nicholas J. Turland. A New Combination in Heteropolygonatum (Convallariaceae, Polygonateae) NOVON 10(2): 156-157. 2000.
- Minoru N. Tamura, Liang Songyun (Liang Song-jun) and Nicholas J. Turland. New Combinations in Campylandra (Convallariaceae, Convallarieae). Novon Vol. 10, No. 2 (Summer, 2000), pp. 158-160
- Jun Yamashita, Art Vogel, Minoru N. Tamura. 2007. Molecular Phylogeny and Taxonomic Reconsideration of the Genus Peliosanthes (Convallariaceae)». 12th Flora of Thailand Meeting
- Minoru N. Tamura. Phylogenetic analyses and chromosome evolution in Convallarieae (Ruscaceae sensu lato), with some taxonomic treatments J. Plant Res. 117 (5): 363—370 2004
- Chen Xinqi, Liang Songyun, Xu Jiemei, Minoru N. Tamura. Liliaceae Flora of China 24: 73–263 2000
- Chase, M. W.; Fay, M. F.; Devey, D. S.; Maurin, O; Rønsted, N; Davies, T. J; Pillon, Y; Petersen, G; Seberg, O; Tamura, M. N.; Asmussen, C. B.; Hilu, K; Borsch, T; Davis, J. I; Stevenson, D. W.; Pires, J. C.; Givnish, T. J.; Sytsma, K. J.; McPherson, M. A.; Graham, S. W.; Rai, H. S. (2006). "Multigene analyses of monocot relationships : a summary" (PDF). Aliso. 22: 63–75. ISSN 0065-6275. Archived from the original (PDF) on 19 July 2011.
- Tamura, M. N. (1998). "Liliaceae". Flowering Plants · Monocotyledons. pp. 343–353. doi:10.1007/978-3-662-03533-7_41. ISBN 978-3-642-08377-8. In Kubitzki (1998)
- Tamura, M. N. (1998). "Calochortaceae". Flowering Plants. Monocotyledons: Lilianae (except Orchidaceae). pp. 164–172. ISBN 9783540640608. In Kubitzki (1998)
- Conran, J.G.; Minoru N. Tamura (1998). "Convallariaceae". pp. 186–198. In Kubitzki (1998)
- Kubitzki, K., ed. (1998). The families and genera of vascular plants. Vol.3. Berlin, Germany: Springer-Verlag. ISBN 978-3-540-64060-8.
