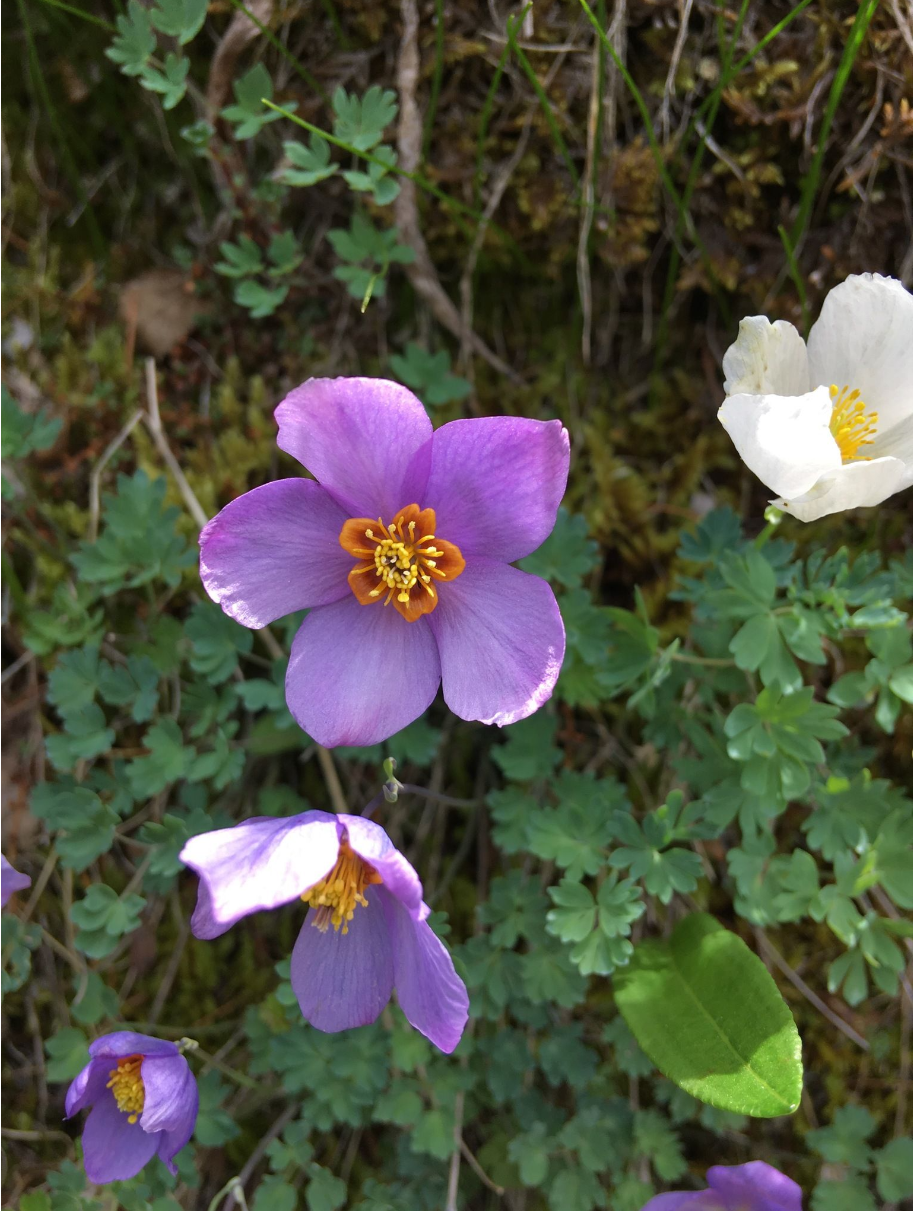
- A flowering Paraquilegia anemonoides
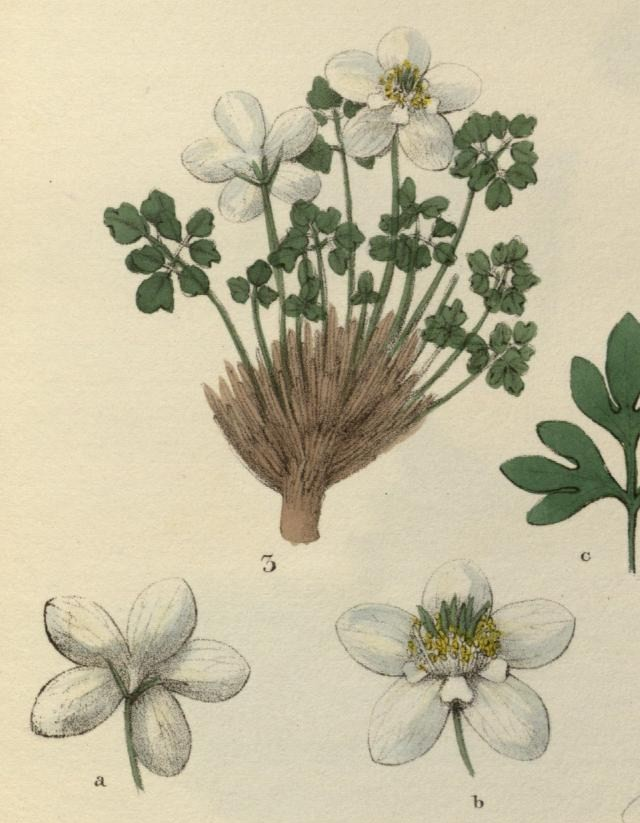
- 1839 illustration of P. anemonoides

Scientific classification
- Kingdom: Plantae
- Clade: Embryophytes
- Clade: Tracheophytes
- Clade: Spermatophytes
- Clade: Angiosperms
- Clade: Eudicots
- Order: Ranunculales
- Family: Ranunculaceae
- Genus: Paraquilegia
- Species: P. anemonoides

Binomial name
- Paraquilegia anemonoides (Willd.) Ulbr.

Synonyms
- Aquilegia anemonoides Willd.; Aquilegia minuta Lebed.; Isopyrum grandiflorum Fisch.; Paraquilegia anemonoides (Willd.) J.R.Drumm. & Hutch.; Paraquilegia microphylla

= Paraquilegia anemonoides =

Species of flowering plant

Paraquilegia anemonoides is a species of perennial flowering plant in the genus Paraquilegia in the family Ranunculaceae. It is native to Central Asia, southwestern Siberia, and the Himalayas. This cushion plant's leaves grows to around 30 mm (1.2 in), with flowering stems reaching 80 mm (3.1 in) tall.

== Description ==
Paraquilegia anemonoides is a species of herbaceous perennial flowering plant in the genus Paraquilegia in the family Ranunculaceae. The leaves of this cushion plant grow to around 30 mm (1.2 in). Flowering stems extend from the plant to 80 mm (3.1 in) tall. Many short, thick stems protrude from the rootstock, which retains old petioles. As the plant ages, this produces a dense cushion. The leaves are typically biternate, with petioles that range from 0.5 cm (0.20 in) to 3.5 cm (1.4 in) long.

== Taxonomy ==
In 1811, the German botanist Carl Ludwig Willdenow gave the description of a species named Aquilegia anemonoides. This species is thought to have been first collected by Petr Ivanovich Schangin, a Russian geologist who performed an expedition to the Altai Mountains in 1786. The German botanist Carl Friedrich von Ledebour listed the species as Aquilegia minuta in a manuscript. In 1824, the Russian botanist Friedrich Ernst Ludwig von Fischer evaluated the species as instead belonging in the genus Isopyrum under the name Isopyrum grandiflorum. In a 1920 article for the Royal Botanic Gardens, Kew's Bulletin of Miscellaneous Information, the British botanists James Ramsay Drummond and John Hutchinson segragatated the genus Paraquilegia from Isopyrum and renamed the species Paraquilegia grandiflorum. In 1919, British rock gardener and plant collector Reginald Farrer described a plant he named Isopyrum farreri; this species is now recognized as a horticultural type of P. anemonoides.

The present name for the species is credited to the German botanist Oskar Eberhard Ulbrich, who published the name in 1922 in the journal Repertorium Specierum Novarum Regni Vegetabilis. The multiplicity of taxonomic synonyms for P. anemonoides was derided by American botanist Robert Nold as "an absolutely harrowing example of the imprecision of botany and the fallibility of observation". The 1924 description of Paraquilegia anemonoides by the Russian botanists Grigorij Silych Karelin and Ivan Petrovich Kirilov has since been identified as synonymous with the currently accepted species named Isopyrum anemonoides.

== Distribution and habitat ==
The species is distributed across Central Asia to southwestern China, ranging from Siberia, Turkestan, and eastwards towards Gansu in China. The Flora of China recorded the species's presence in Afghanistan, Bhutan, Kashmir, Kazakhstan, Mongolia, Pakistan, and Russia, as well as the Chinese jurisdictions of Gansu, Ningxia, Qinghai, Xinjiang, and Xizang. It favors crevices on dry cliffs and alpine meadows at elevations between 2,600 m (8,500 ft) and 3,400 m (11,200 ft).

== Cultivation ==
Pruning is unnecessary for the maintenance of the Paraquilegia anemonoides. The plant requires moist but well-drained soil. The species is successful in chalk, sand, and loam.
