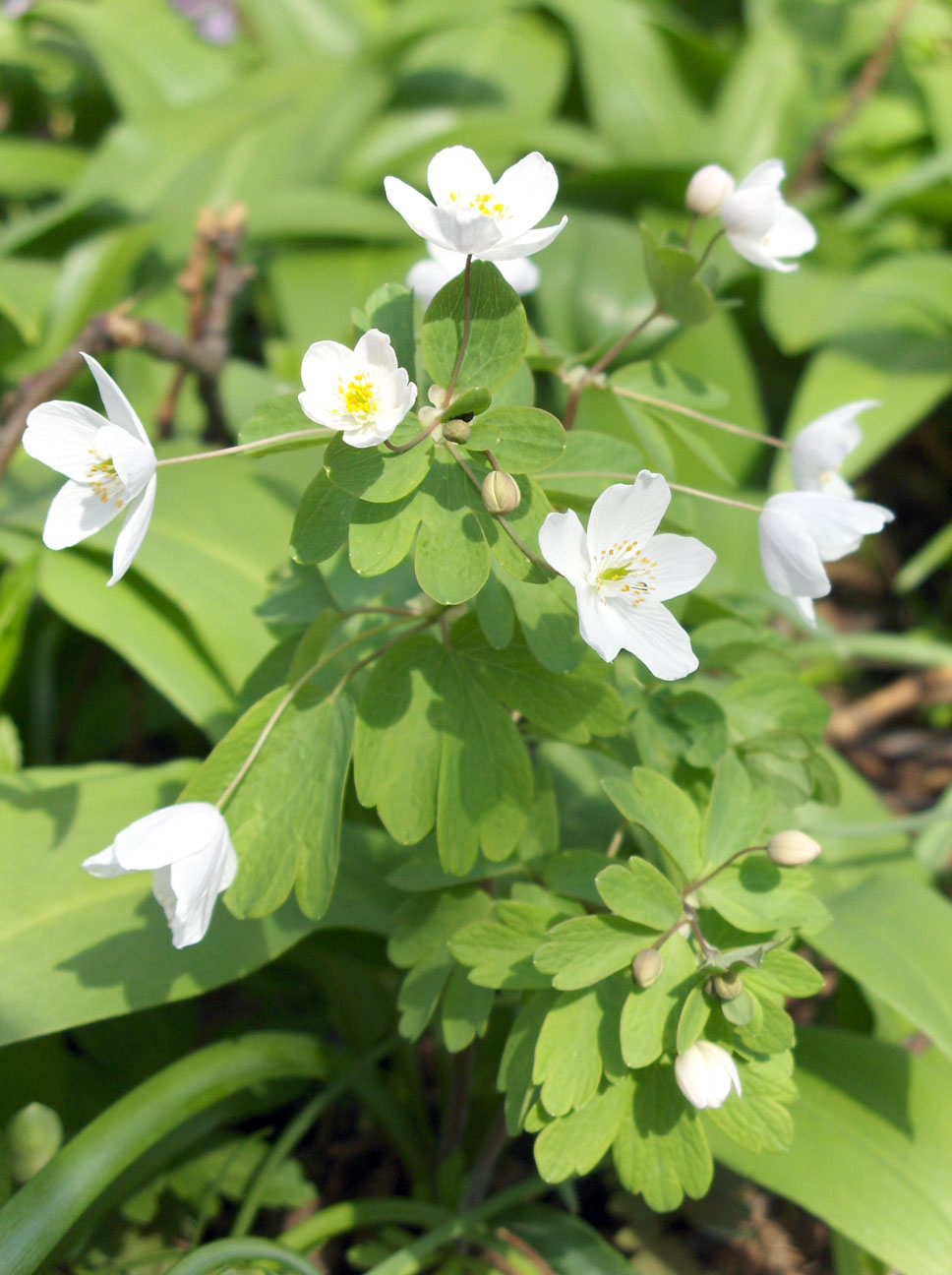
- Isopyrum thalictroides

Scientific classification
- Kingdom: Plantae
- Clade: Tracheophytes
- Clade: Angiosperms
- Clade: Eudicots
- Order: Ranunculales
- Family: Ranunculaceae
- Subfamily: Thalictroideae
- Genus: Isopyrum; L.

Type species
- Isopyrum thalictroides L.

= Isopyrum =

Genus of flowering plants

Isopyrum is a genus of four species of flowering plants of the family Ranunculaceae native to Eurasia. Isopyrum species have white flowers with five sepals and five petals.

The genus was first described in 1753 by the biologist Carl Linnaeus. In 1920, the genus Paraquilegia was segregated out from Isopyrum to contain plants that are more morphologically aligned with members of the genus Aquilegia (columbines). Several species from North America and eastern Asia formerly included in Isopyrum have also been transferred to the genera Dichocarpum and Enemion.

== Description ==
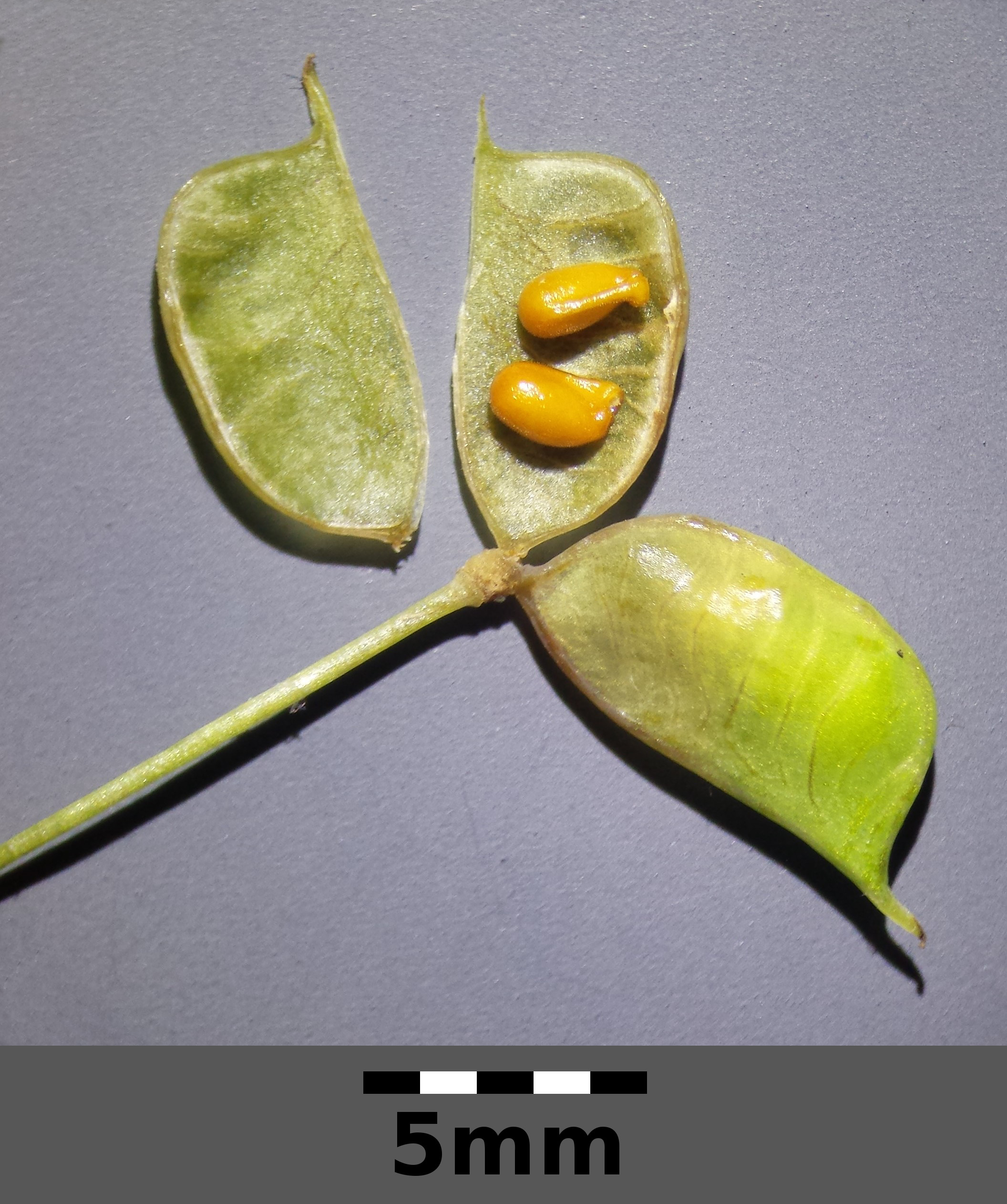
Fruit and seeds of Isopyrum thalictroides

Isopyrum is a genus of perennial herbs in the family Ranunculaceae. The smooth and glabrous stems stand erect. Leaves are biternate. The leaves attached to the base of the stem are pale green on the bottom and green on the top. Leaves attached to the stem have short petioles with white sheathes.

Flowers on Isopyrum plants have radial symmetry. Each flower possesses five sepals and five petals. Sepals are white and petaloid. The petals are substantially smaller than the sepals. Each flower also features yellow anthers and between 20 and 30 stamens. There are between one and five pistils (female sex organs) to a flower.

Isopyrum fruit are stored in follicles that appear in groups of one to five. Each bears numerous seeds. These seeds are smooth and have an ovoid to ellipsoid shape. The seeds can be varying shades of black.

== Taxonomy ==
The genus Isopyrum was first described by the Swedish biologist Carl Linnaeus in 1753. In 1920, British botanists James Ramsay Drummond and John Hutchinson published a paper, "A Revision of Isopyrum (Ranunculaceae) and Its Nearer Allies", in the Royal Botanic Gardens, Kew's Bulletin of Miscellaneous Information to address problems that had developed within the genus. Prior to their paper, the genus had permitted substantial morphological variance to coexist with certain species demonstrating greater affinities towards the genus Aquilegia (columbines). Part of the pair's proposed resolution was creating Paraquilegia and expanding the genus Semiaquilegia.

== Distribution ==
The Royal Botanic Gardens, Kew's Plants of the World Online (POWO) database, which accepts four species, considers Isopyrum as a solely Eurasian genus. POWO treats Isopyrum as native to Spain, France, much of Eastern Europe, and across Asia from Kazakhstan and Pakistan east through northern China to Korea and the far east of Russia. POWO also notes the genus as introduced in Denmark and Germany.

== Species ==
Many of the species formerly placed in Isopyrum are now placed in other genera of the Ranunculaceae, especially Enemion and Dichocarpum. Accepted species include:

- Isopyrum ludlowii Tamura & Lauener
- Isopyrum manshuricum (Komarov) Komarov ex W.T.Wang & Hsiao
- Isopyrum thalictroides L.

Synonyms include:

- Isopyrum arisanense (Hayata) Ohwi = Dichocarpum arisanense (Hayata) W.T.Wang & P.K.Hsiao
- Isopyrum auriculatum Franch. = Dichocarpum auriculatum (Franch.) W.T.Wang & P.K.Hsiao
- Isopyrum biternatum (Raf.) Torr. & A.Gray = Enemion biternatum Raf.
- Isopyrum dicarpon Miq. = Dichocarpum dicarpon (Miq.) W.T.Wang & Hsiao
- Isopyrum hakonense Maekawa & Tuyama ex Ohwi = Dichocarpum hakonense (Maekawa & Tuyama ex Ohwi) W.T.Wang & Hsiao
- Isopyrum hallii A.Gray = Enemion hallii (A.Gray) J.R.Drumm. & Hutchinson
- Isopyrum leveilleanum Nakai = Semiaquilegia adoxoides (DC.) Makino
- Isopyrum nipponicum Franch. = Dichocarpum nipponicum (Franch.) W.T.Wang & Hsiao
- Isopyrum numajirianum Makino = Dichocarpum numajirianum (Makino) W.T.Wang & Hsiao
- Isopyrum occidentale Hook. & Arn. = Enemion occidentale (Hook. & Arn.) J.R.Drumm. & Hutch.
- Isopyrum pterigionocaudatum Koidz. = Dichocarpum nipponicum (Franch.) W.T.Wang & Hsiao
- Isopyrum raddeanum (Regel) Maxim. = Enemion raddeanum Regel
- Isopyrum savilei Calder & Roy L.Taylor = Enemion savilei (Calder & Roy L.Taylor) Keener
- Isopyrum stipitatum A.Gray = Enemion stipitatum (A.Gray) J.R.Drumm. & Hutch.
- Isopyrum stoloniferum Maxim. = Dichocarpum stoloniferum (Maxim.) W.T.Wang & Hsiao
- Isopyrum trachyspermum Maxim. = Dichocarpum trachyspermum (Maxim.) W.T.Wang & Hsiao
- Isopyrum uniflorum Aitch. & Hemsl. = Paraquilegia uniflora (Aitch. & Hemsl.) J.Drumm. & Hutch.
