= James Ramsay Drummond =

James Ramsay Drummond (1851–1921) was a civil servant in India, and amateur botanist. Born in Scotland, he graduated BA from New College, Oxford in 1872. He had a distinguished botanical ancestry; his great-uncle was the botanist James Drummond (1784–1863), while his grandfather was the botanical collector Thomas Drummond (1780–1835).

== Indian Civil Service ==
Drummond began a 30-year career in the Indian Civil Service (ICS) in 1874. Posted to the Punjab, he served first as Assistant Commissioner, then as District Judge and Deputy Commissioner.

== Botany ==
During his long career in the ICS, Drummond also gained an expert knowledge of the flora of the western Punjab, where he made significant collections of plant specimens. He also collected in the Simla Hills, around Dalhousie and the Ganges. During his last few months in India, he was appointed curator of the herbarium at the Calcutta Royal Botanic Gardens. On his return to England in 1905, he continued his botanical work at Kew, determining his collections and preparing a flora of the Punjab. However, poor health compromised his efforts and he died having published only a few works, notably a detailed paper on the Agave and Furcraea of India co-written by David Prain and published in the Land Records and Agriculture, Bengal, 1905.
