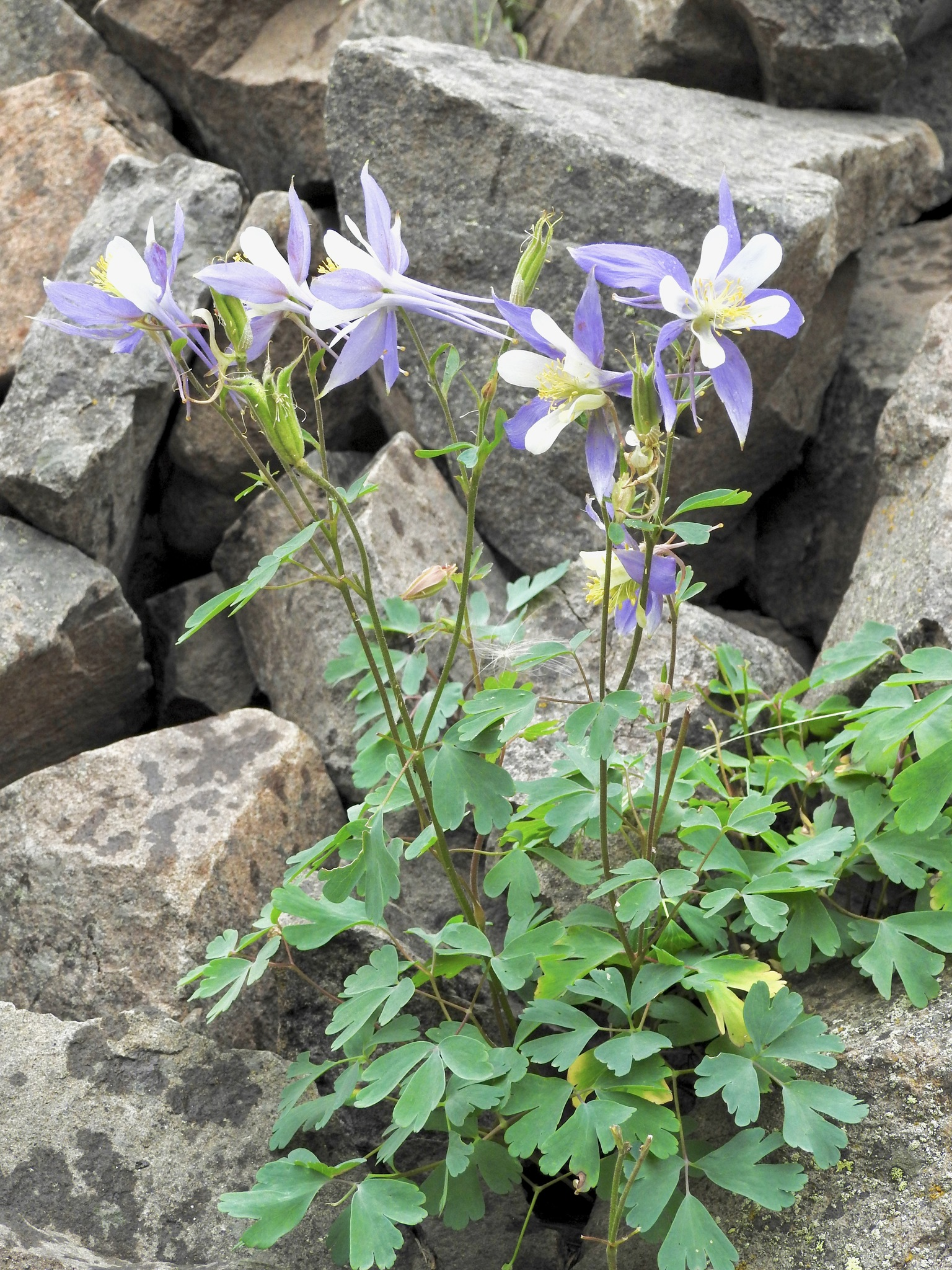

Conservation status
- Secure (NatureServe)

Scientific classification
- Kingdom: Plantae
- Clade: Tracheophytes
- Clade: Angiosperms
- Clade: Eudicots
- Order: Ranunculales
- Family: Ranunculaceae
- Genus: Aquilegia
- Species: A. coerulea

Binomial name
- Aquilegia coerulea E.James

Varieties
- Aquilegia coerulea var. alpina; Aquilegia coerulea var. coerulea; Aquilegia coerulea var. ochroleuca; Aquilegia coerulea var. pinetorum

Synonyms
- List: Aquilegia canadensis subsp. coerulea (E.James) Brühl; Aquilegia formosa subsp. coerulea (E.James) Brühl

= Aquilegia coerulea =

North American species of columbine

Aquilegia coerulea, commonly called the Colorado columbine, Rocky Mountain columbine, or blue columbine, is a species of flowering plant in the buttercup family, native to the Rocky Mountains in the western United States. It is a moderate sized wildflower that grows in mountainous areas from the foothills to above timberline. The flowers are mainly pollinated by bumblebees and several species of hawkmoths. The species has been the state flower of Colorado since 1899 and with its large, showy flowers is a frequent garden plant and used in the breeding of columbine hybrids. The botanical name coerulea (or caerulea) means 'sky blue'.

== Description ==
Aquilegia coerulea is a herbaceous plant with flowering stems that may be 15–80 centimeters (6–31 in) when fully grown. They are perennial plants that typically live for four to six years; regrowing from a simple or branched rootstock that is covered in the bases of old petioles, the stems that support individual leaves. The basal leaves, the ones growing from the base of the plant, are always shorter than the flowering stems, just 9–37 cm (3.5–14.5 in) tall. They are compound leaves that are usually biternate, having nine leaflets in total in groups of three. However, occasionally they may be simply trifoliate, divided into just three leaflets, or tripinnate with each leaf divided to three levels with 21 leaflets in total. Each leaflet is quite thin and has three lobes. On their upper sides they are green and glabrous, smooth and hairless. They may either be glabrous or pubescent, covered in fine, minute hairs, on the undersides. Leaflets most often range in size from 1.3–4.2 cm (0.5–1.7 in), but occasionally may be as long as 6.1 cm (2.4 in).

In the wild, blooming can commence as early as late April and might occur as late as early September, though usually plants are not found in bloom earlier than May. Mature plants grow one to ten flowering stems, though averaging three to four, each with three to four flowers. The flower furthest out on a stem opens first and then each opens in sequence downward. The plant flower buds nod, facing somewhat downward. The flowers are large and showy with a diameter of as much as 15 centimeters (6 in), but more often about 5–10 cm (2–4 in). Flowers tend to be smaller on plants growing at higher elevations. They are so striking that the botanists E. O. Wooton and Paul C. Standley enthusiastically wrote of them in their 1915 Flora of New Mexico,

"This is the State flower of Colorado and no other State has one so beautiful. Few indeed are the flowers of the Rockies that can compare with this in beauty. The great blossoms, sometimes six inches in diameter, look like bits of fallen sky, and when the plants cover acres of meadow, as they sometimes do, no words can be found to do them justice."

The flowers are atop erect stems, ones that stand perpendicular to the ground, and have five large, spreading sepals that resemble petals in shades of white to deep-blue or occasionally pink in their wild condition. The sepals range in shape from a flattened circle with somewhat pointed ends with the widest part moved toward the base (elliptic-ovate) to like a somewhat egg shaped spear head (lance-ovate). They range in size from 2.6 to 5.1 cenimeters long and 0.8–2.3 cm.

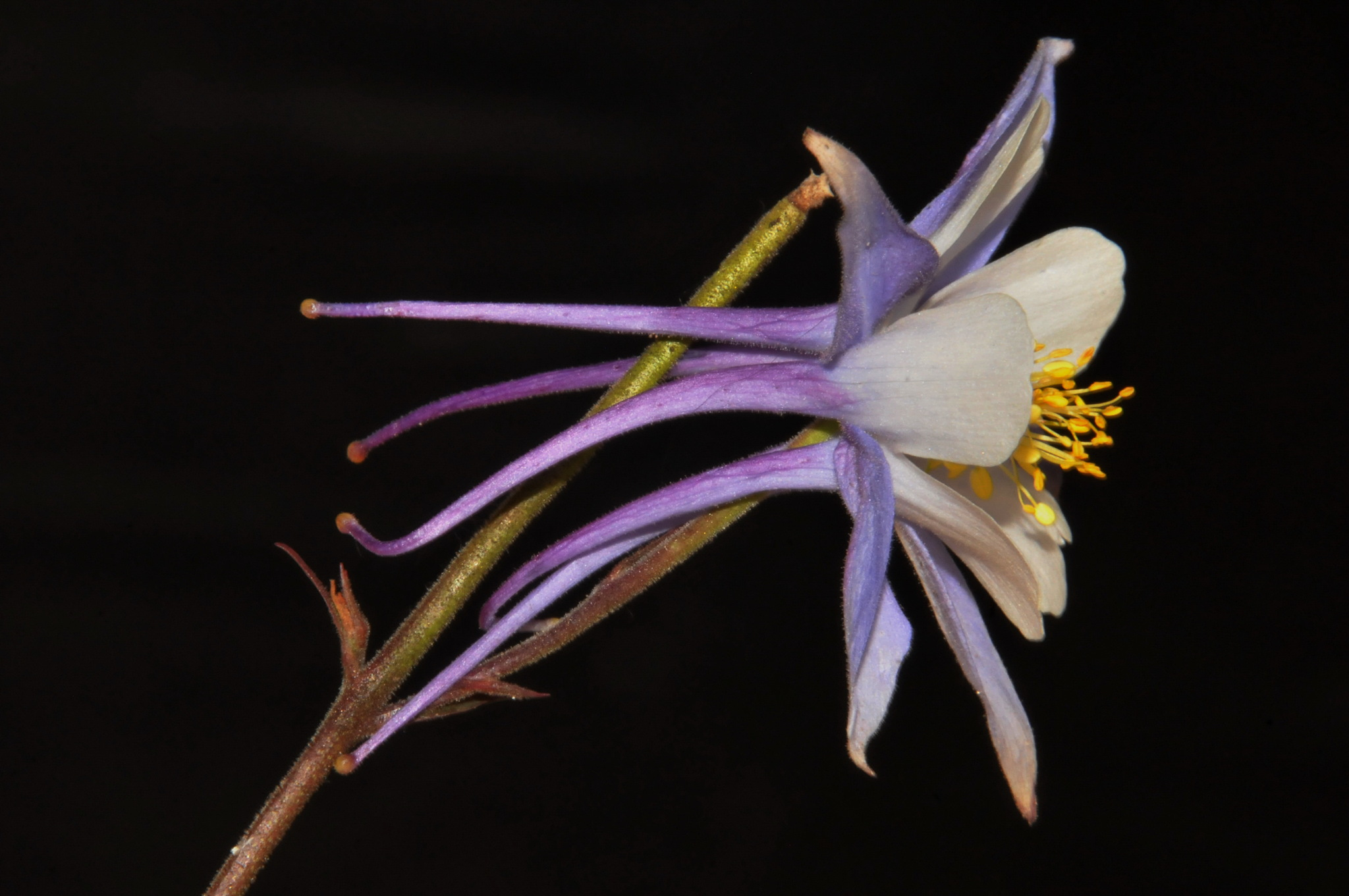
Variety coerulea side view showing spurs, photographed near Rabbit Ears Pass

The five petals have very long tapered spurs, ranging from 2.5 to 7.2 centimeters in length, though usually longer than 3.4 cm. The spurs are almost straight, but curve outwards slightly and end in a small knob at the tip. The blades of the petals are 1.3–2.8 cm long by 0.5–1.4 cm wide. Petals are most often white to cream in color at the front with the spurs having the same range of colors as the sepals. The flowers are scented and produce more volatile molecules during the day than in the evening.

The center of the flower has a projecting cluster of numerous bright orange-yellow stamens, 50–130 total. The flowers are protandrous, developing pollen before the stigma becomes receptive. The stamens range in length from 1.3 to 2.4 cm. They surround three to ten unfused carpels with flowers most frequently having six, but varying even on the same plant. If fertilized each of the carpels may develop into a follicle, a dry pod that splits along one side. Each of the pods is round in cross section and is filled with small, smooth, black seeds. Both the number of pods that develop and the number of seeds in the pods decrease for flowers that bloom later on a plant.

The leaves may be mistaken for that of a meadowrue (Thalictrum), but the flowers are entirely different and the species cannot be confused while flowering. Similar columbines in its range include rock columbine (Aquilegia scopulorum), blue limestone columbine (Aquilegia jonesii), Mancos columbine (Aquilegia micrantha), and dwarf blue columbine (Aquilegia saximontana). Rock columbine has leaves that are covered in natural waxes making them blue-green (glaucous) rather than green. It is found in Nevada and Utah. Blue limestone columbine has much shorter spurs on its flowers, just 0.8–1.5 cm and grows to the north in Wyoming, Montana, and Alberta. Mancos columbine has viscid, very sticky, leaves. Dwarf blue columbine is only found at very high elevations in rocky areas and has strongly hooked spurs about 2 cm (0.8 in) long as well as being a smaller plant.

== Taxonomy ==
Closest relatives of A. coerulea

- - A. scopulorum
  - - A. pubescens
    - - A. eximia
      - - A. flavescens
        - A. formosa
- A. chrysantha
- - A. longissima
  - A. skinneri
  - - A. elegantula
    - A. coerulea

Part of the phylogeny of the genus Aquilegia, based on Fior et al. 2013.

Aquilegia coerulea is classified in genus Aquilegia in the family Ranunculaceae. A 2013 study found that it is most closely related to Aquilegia elegantula, Aquilegia skinneri, and Aquilegia longissima, with all columbine species from the Americas likely splitting from their Eurasian relatives in the Middle Pliocene some 2.3–5.5 million years ago. In Utah the species is documented to hybridize with Aquilegia elegantula, Aquilegia flavescens, and Aquilegia formosa.

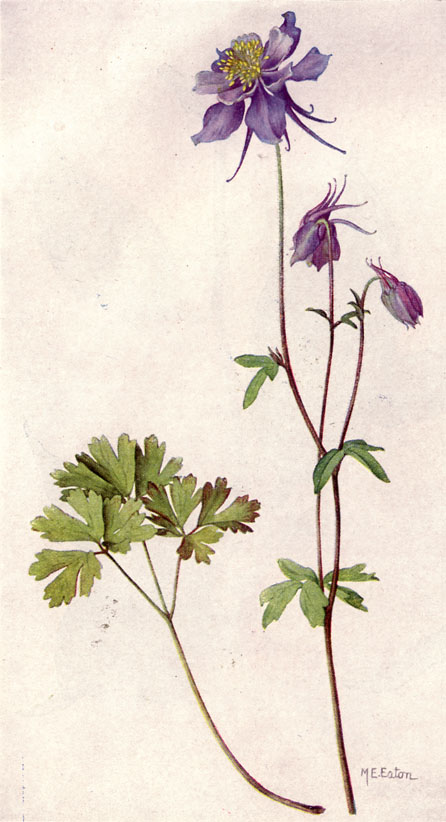
Blue columbine painted by Mary Emily Eaton, 1917

The first scientific description of Aquilegia coerulea was by the American scientist Edwin James in 1822. Though Aquilegia coerulea was the original spelling by James, it has often been spelled as Aquilegia caerulea as this is more correct Latin. However, the rules of taxonomic nomenclature generally prefer the original spelling and this is the name adopted by the Board of International Botanic Nomenclature. James found the first specimen he collected in a thicket of scrub oak near what is today Palmer Lake, Colorado, while on the Stephen H. Long Expedition of 1820. After James's description seven species, six subspecies, five varieties, and two botanical forms have been described that are considered to be synonyms of the species or one of its four varieties.

Table of Synonyms
Name	Year	Rank	Synonym of:	Notes
Aquilegia advena Regel	1856	species	var. coerulea	= het.
Aquilegia caerulea E.James	1823	species	var. coerulea	= het. orth. var.
Aquilegia canadensis subsp. coerulea (E.James) Brühl	1893	subspecies	Aquilegia coerulea	≡ hom.
Aquilegia coerulea subsp. albiflora A.Gray ex Payson	1918	subspecies	var. ochroleuca	≡ hom.
Aquilegia coerulea var. albiflora A.Gray	1895	variety	var. ochroleuca	≡ hom. nom. superfl.
Aquilegia coerulea subsp. alpina (A.Nelson) Payson	1918	subspecies	var. alpina	≡ hom.
Aquilegia coerulea subsp. daileyae (Eastw.) Payson	1918	subspecies	var. coerulea	= het.
Aquilegia coerulea var. daileyae Eastw.	1897	variety	var. coerulea	= het.
Aquilegia coerulea f. glandulosa Cockerell	1891	form	var. coerulea	= het.
Aquilegia coerulea var. leptoceras (Nutt.) A.Nelson	1909	variety	var. ochroleuca	≡ hom. nom. superfl.
Aquilegia coerulea var. macrantha (Hook. & Arn.) Brühl	1893	variety	var. coerulea	= het.
Aquilegia coerulea f. pallidiflora Cockerell	1891	form	var. coerulea	= het.
Aquilegia coerulea subsp. pinetorum (Tidestr.) Payson	1918	subspecies	var. pinetorum	≡ hom.
Aquilegia formosa subsp. coerulea (E.James) Brühl	1893	subspecies	Aquilegia coerulea	≡ hom.
Aquilegia formosa var. macrantha (Hook. & Arn.) Brühl	1893	variety	var. coerulea	= het.
Aquilegia leptoceras Nutt.	1834	species	var. ochroleuca	≡ hom.
Aquilegia macrantha Hook. & Arn.	1838	species	var. coerulea	= het.
Aquilegia oreophila Rydb.	1902	species	var. coerulea	= het.
Aquilegia piersoniana L.O.Williams	1934	species	var. coerulea	= het.
Aquilegia pinetorum Tidestr.	1910	species	var. pinetorum	≡ hom.
Notes: ≡ homotypic synonym; = heterotypic synonym

=== Varieties ===
There are four widely accepted varieties of Aquilegia coerulea according to Plants of the World Online, World Flora Online, and World Plants. Though World Plants additionally lists Aquilegia coerulea var. daileyae Eastw. as valid as does the USDA Natural Resources Conservation Service (NRCS) PLANTS database. However, in the Intermountain Flora Volume Two, Part A published in 2012 the authors only recognized two varieties, coerulea and ochroleuca. They wrote of the other varieties, "To us, the sizes of the spurs, stamens, and petals are too variable to sort into meaningful varieties."

==== Aquilegia coerulea var. alpina ====
This variety was scientifically described by the botanist Aven Nelson in 1896. It is known by the common name of Colorado alpine columbine. Though botanical writers such as Robert Nold doubt the validity of the variety. It differs from the other varieties by having much smaller petal blades, only 1.3–1.7 centimeters instead of 1.9–2.8 centimeters. It grows on open rocky slopes in the state of Wyoming at elevations of 2,100–3,500 meters (6,900–11,500 ft). It always has pale blue sepals and flowers from June to August. NatureServe has not evaluated the variety since 2001, but at that time they listed it as vulnerable (T3), but they also list it as possibly extirpated from Wyoming and with an unevaluated status in Utah.

==== Aquilegia coerulea var. coerulea ====
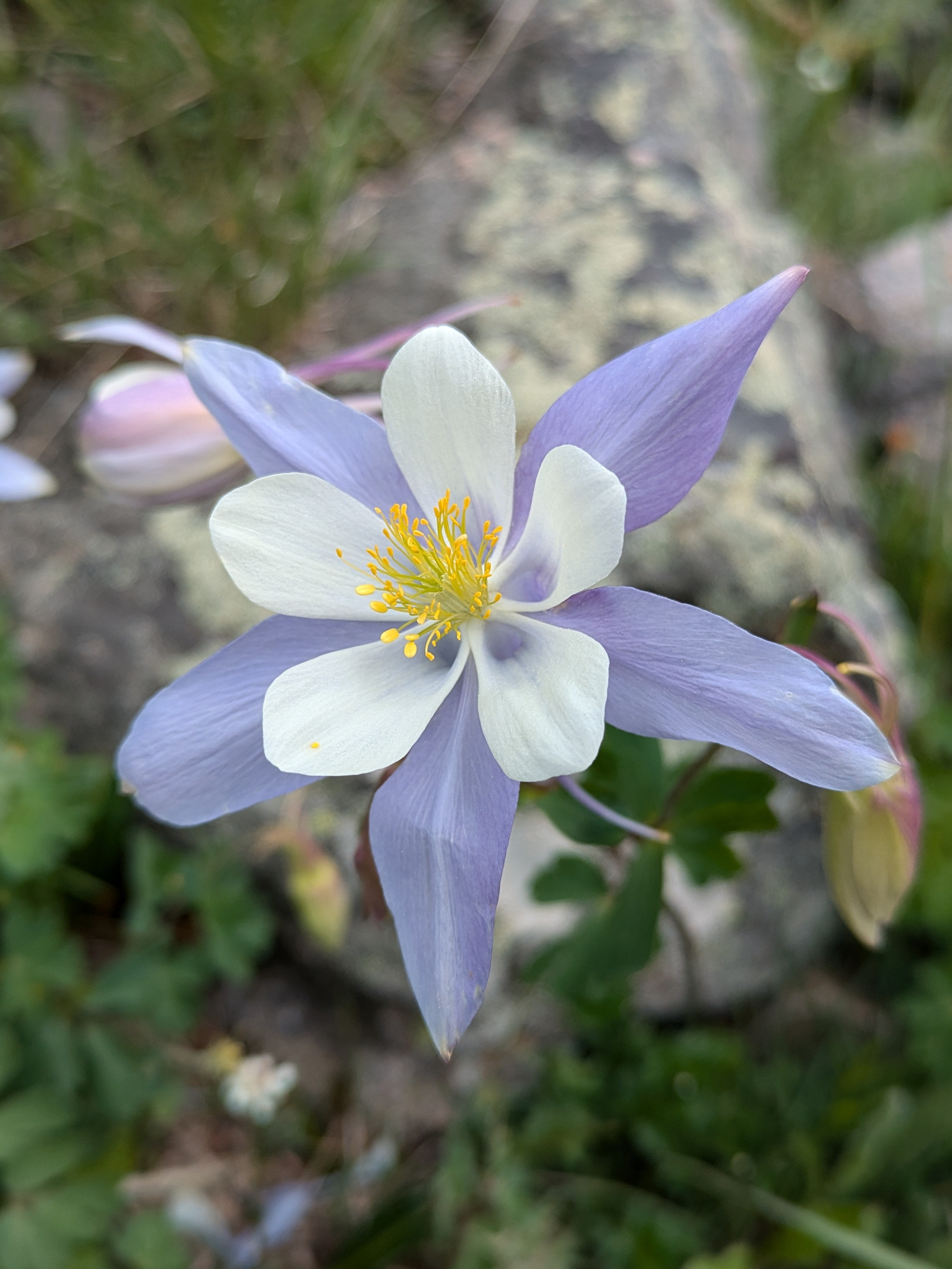
Aquilegia coerulea var. coerulea photographed in Clear Creek County, Colorado

Five species were described at various times that are considered heterotypic synonyms of this variety. According to the Flora of North America the autonymic variety of the species only grows in Wyoming, New Mexico, and Colorado at elevations of 2,100–3,500 meters (6,900–11,500 ft). However, the NRCS PLANTS database lists it in the states of Idaho, Montana, and South Dakota, without giving any specific information about the locations where it grows.

It is distinguished from the two following varieties by having medium to deep blue sepals where they have white, pale blue, or pink sepals. Its sepals range in length from 2.8 to 5.1 centimeters. The petals have spurs that are 3.4–4.8 cm long while their blades are usually 2.0–2.4 cm, though occasionally as short as 1.7 cm. They grow on rocky slopes, near streams, in open woodlands, and in herb dominated meadows. They flower in the summer starting in mid-June and may flower as late as early September. NatureServe evaluated the variety in 2004 and found it to be apparently secure (T4) globally and in Wyoming. They did not evaluate the rest of its range.

==== Aquilegia coerulea var. daileyae ====
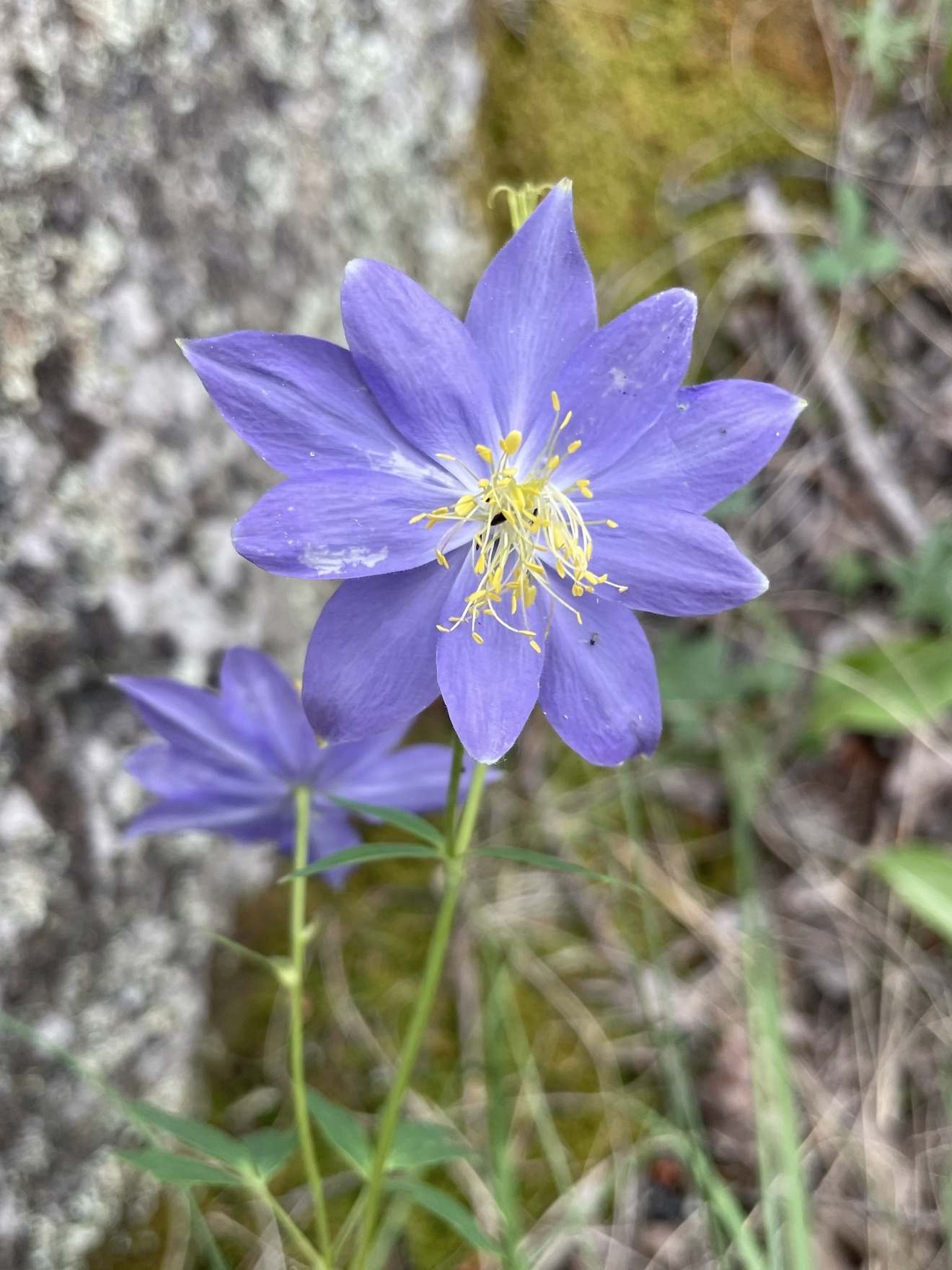
Spurless columbine photographed south of Estes Park, Colorado

This disputed variety was described by the botanist Alice Eastwood in 1897. It is a variation where the petals lack spurs and both the petals and spurs are colored deep blue and commonly called spurless columbine, but is also sometimes called Dailey's columbine or star-flowered columbine. Most species of columbine occasionally produce these 'stellate' forms. The spurless columbine may be found in identical habitats to var. coerulea, but only in the state of Colorado. From the foothills to alpine areas forest openings. Part of the reason for its persistances is a lower level of the flowers being eaten by various herbivores such as deer, caterpillars, and aphids.

Colorado resident Anna Dailey collected specimens of the spurless columbine near Evergreen, Colorado and sent them to Eastwood. A genetic mutation causes the petals to be replaced with a second set of sepals. The population continues to reproduce in and near the Reynolds Park open space in Jefferson County, Colorado. They are also found around Estes Park, Colorado near Rocky Mountain National Park. Though lacking parts to produce nectar the flowers are still pollinated by bumblebees, which collect pollen from the plants. When NatureServe evaluated it in 1991 as a variety they rated it as imperiled (T2).

==== Aquilegia coerulea var. ochroleuca ====
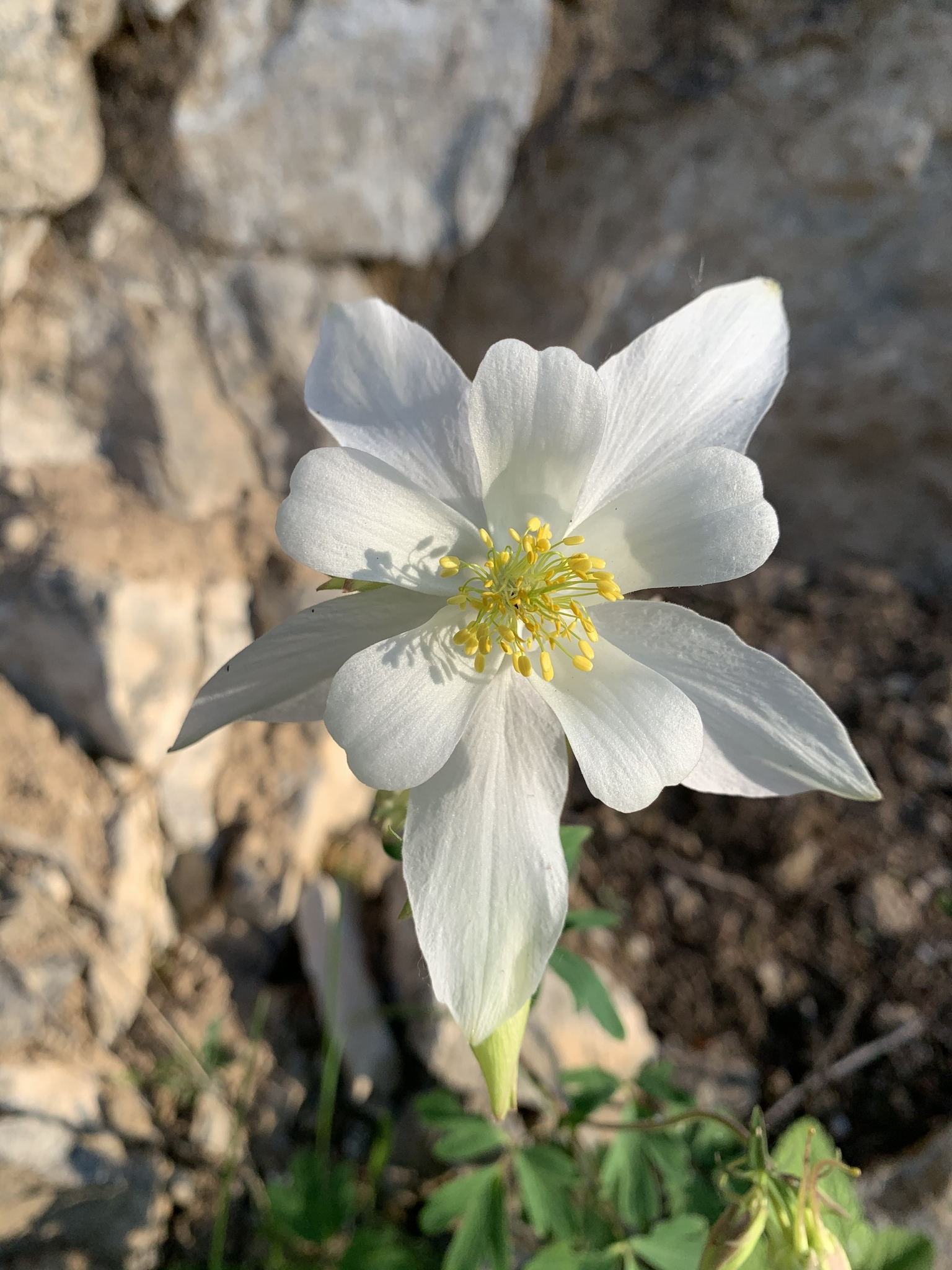
Aquilegia coerulea var. ochroleuca, a white flowered form photographed in Teton County, Wyoming

William Jackson Hooker described this variety in 1864. It had previously been described as a species by Thomas Nuttall in 1834 with the name Aquilegia leptoceras. This species name was also unnecessarily reclassified as Aquilegia coerulea var. leptoceras by Aven Nelson in 1909. It was inadvertently described by Asa Gray as Aquilegia coerulea var. albiflora in 1895 from which it was reclassified by Edwin Blake Payson as a subspecies in 1918. It was not recognized as a distinct variety of the species in A Utah Flora in 1987 and by Alan T. Whittemore in 1997.

It differs from var. coerulea by having lighter blue or white sepals (occasionally pink) and from var. pinetorum by having shorter flower spurs (usually 4–4.8 cm, but possibly 3.6–5.4 cm) and shorter stamens (1.3–1.8 cm). It grows in Idaho, Montana, Nevada, Utah, and Wyoming at elevations of 2,000–3,600 meters (6,600–11,800 ft). It flowers as early as late June and may bloom as late as August. It is commonly known as white Colorado columbine, despite the fact that it may have light blue or pink sepals. When it was evaluated by NatureServe in 2004, they assigned it the status of apparently secure (T4).

==== Aquilegia coerulea var. pinetorum ====
This variety was first described as a species with the name Aquilegia pinetorum in 1910 by Ivar Tidestrom. The type specimen was collected on the Kaibab Plateau in Coconino County, Arizona. In 1918 Edwin Blake Payson described it as subspecies of Aquilegia coerulea and in 1942 Thomas Henry Kearney and Robert Hibbs Peebles gave it the present classification as Aquilegia coerulea var. pinetorum.

Like var. ochroleuca it may have white to pale blue sepals, occasionally light pink, while it has longer petal spurs (usually 5–5.8 cm, but ranging from 4.5 to 7.2 cm) and longer flower stamens (1.7–2.4 cm). This variety is found in Utah and Arizona at elevations of 1,800–3,400 meters (5,900–11,200 ft). They may flower starting in May or as late as September. The variety is reported to intergrade with Aquilegia chrysantha (golden columbine) north of the grand canyon with Philip A. Munz observing it is very difficult to distinguish between dried specimens in herbariums. When the variety was evaluated by NatureServe in 2004 they rated it as a vulnerable variety (T3) over the whole of its range and crititcally imperiled in the state of Nevada.

=== Names ===
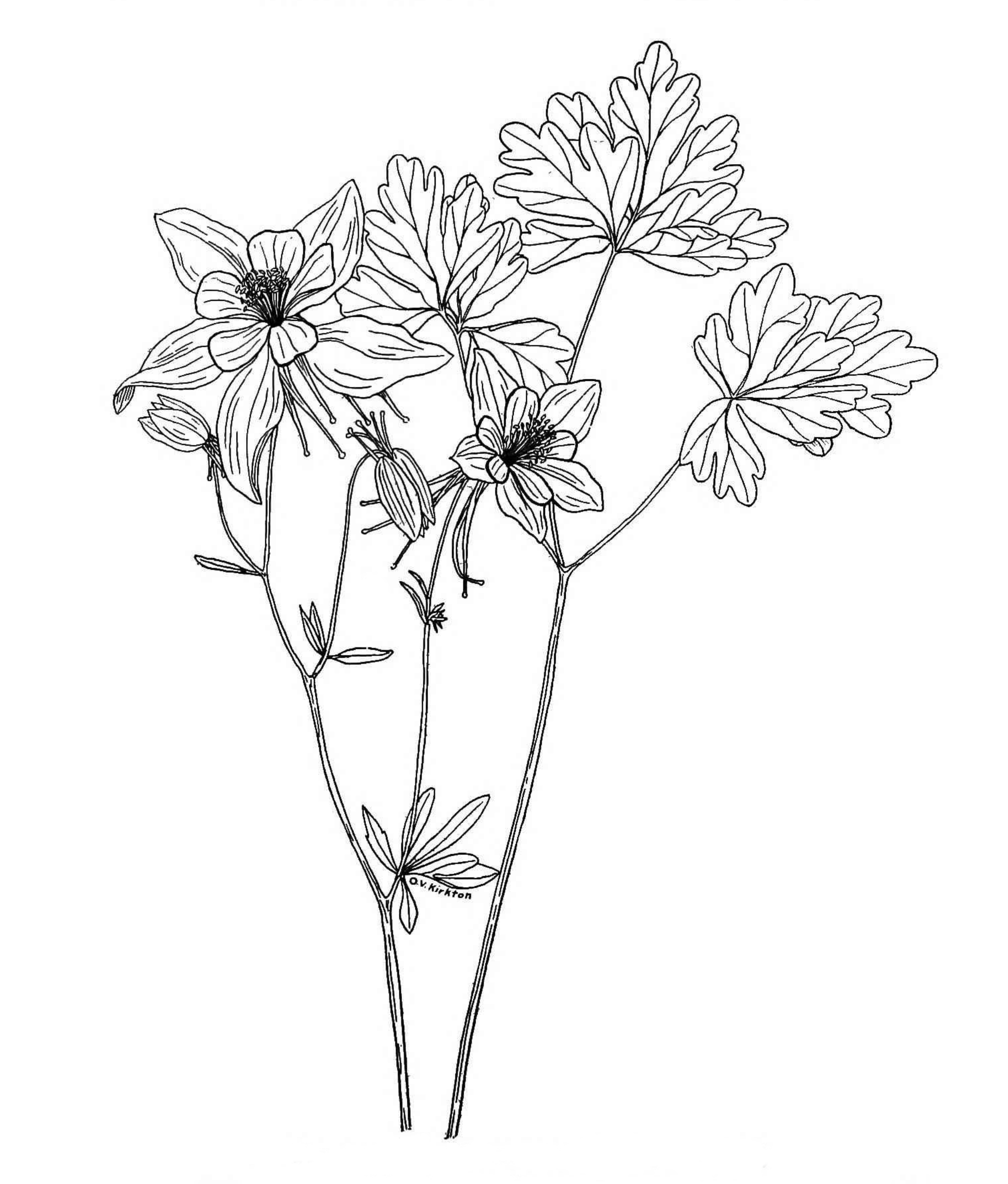
Illustrated by O.V. Kirkton, 1909

The genus name, Aquilegia, is frequently said to mean 'eagle-like'. The author Bill Casselman strongly asserts this to be incorrect and that the name derives from the Latin adjective aquilegus with the meaning 'drawing water'. The species name, coerulea, is Botanical Latin meaning 'sky-blue' or 'dark-blue'. Its name was sometimes spelled caerulea, but coerulea was the spelling in the original description of the species.

Two of the most frequently used common names in English are Colorado columbine and Colorado blue columbine. However, the species is also called Rocky Mountain columbine for its wider natural range, however this name is also infrequently applied to Aquilegia saximontana. The common name columbine is suggested to be related to the Latin for 'dove' for a resemblance of five doves drinking at a fountain. Aquilegia coerulea is also known as blue columbine or simply as columbine, though Aquilegia brevistyla is occasionally known as blue columbine and many species are casually called columbines such as Aquilegia canadensis.

In the Gosiute dialect of the Shoshoni language Aquilegia coerulea is called either pa'-wa-gúmp or pa'-o-gûm-pi as recorded by Ralph Vary Chamberlin.

== Range and habitat ==
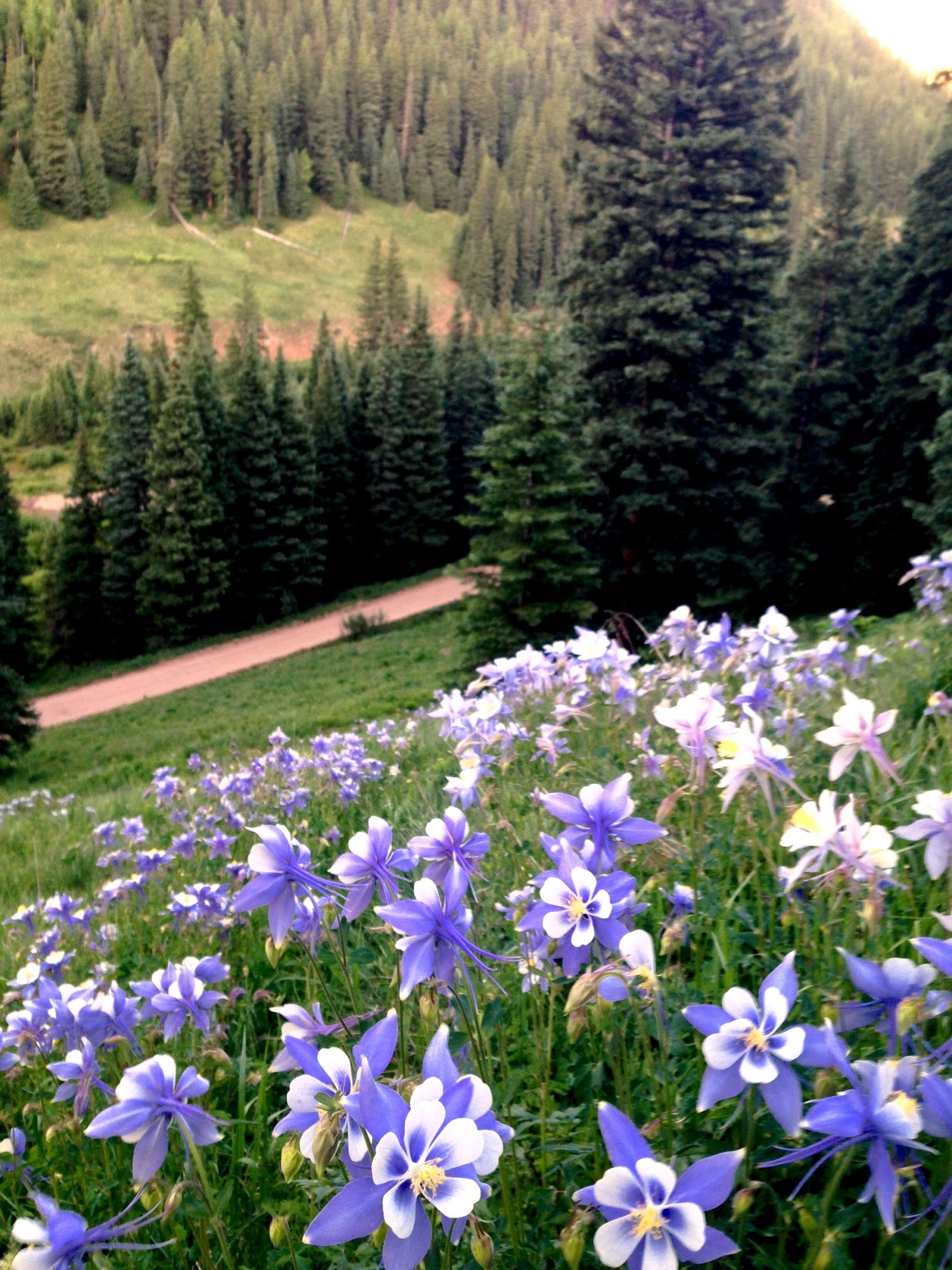
Meadow of Aquilegia coerulea in the San Juan National Forest

Colorado columbine is native to the Rocky Mountains from northern New Mexico to southern Montana. It grows in all of the mountainous western half of Colorado and Wyoming. Additionally it grows in every county of Utah, parts of Nevada, and northern Arizona. It is listed by the USDA as growing in Idaho and South Dakota, but without county level distributions. The species was reported to grow in the Caribou–Targhee National Forest in eastern Idaho in 1973. Though the geographic center of the range is in eastern Utah, the greatest number of plants is found in the mountains of north central Colorado.

Rocky Mountain columbine grows in mountainous areas, starting at lower elevations with the Rocky Mountain Douglas-fir (Pseudotsuga menziesii var. glauca). They become more common at higher elevations in montane ecosystems and subalpine habitats with some growing above timberline in the alpine tundra. The lowest elevations where they grow naturally is 1,800 meters (5,900 ft) for Aquilegia coerulea var. pinetorum and the highest is 3,600 meters (11,800 ft) for Aquilegia coerulea var. coerulea in the southern Rocky Mountains. This species of columbine grows poorly in heavy soils without good drainage. However, it prefers moist areas and is very often found in quaking aspen groves. It will also grow in the open coniferous forests, meadows, and in clearings. When there is sufficient water they will thrive on rocky outcrops and slopes.

== Ecology ==
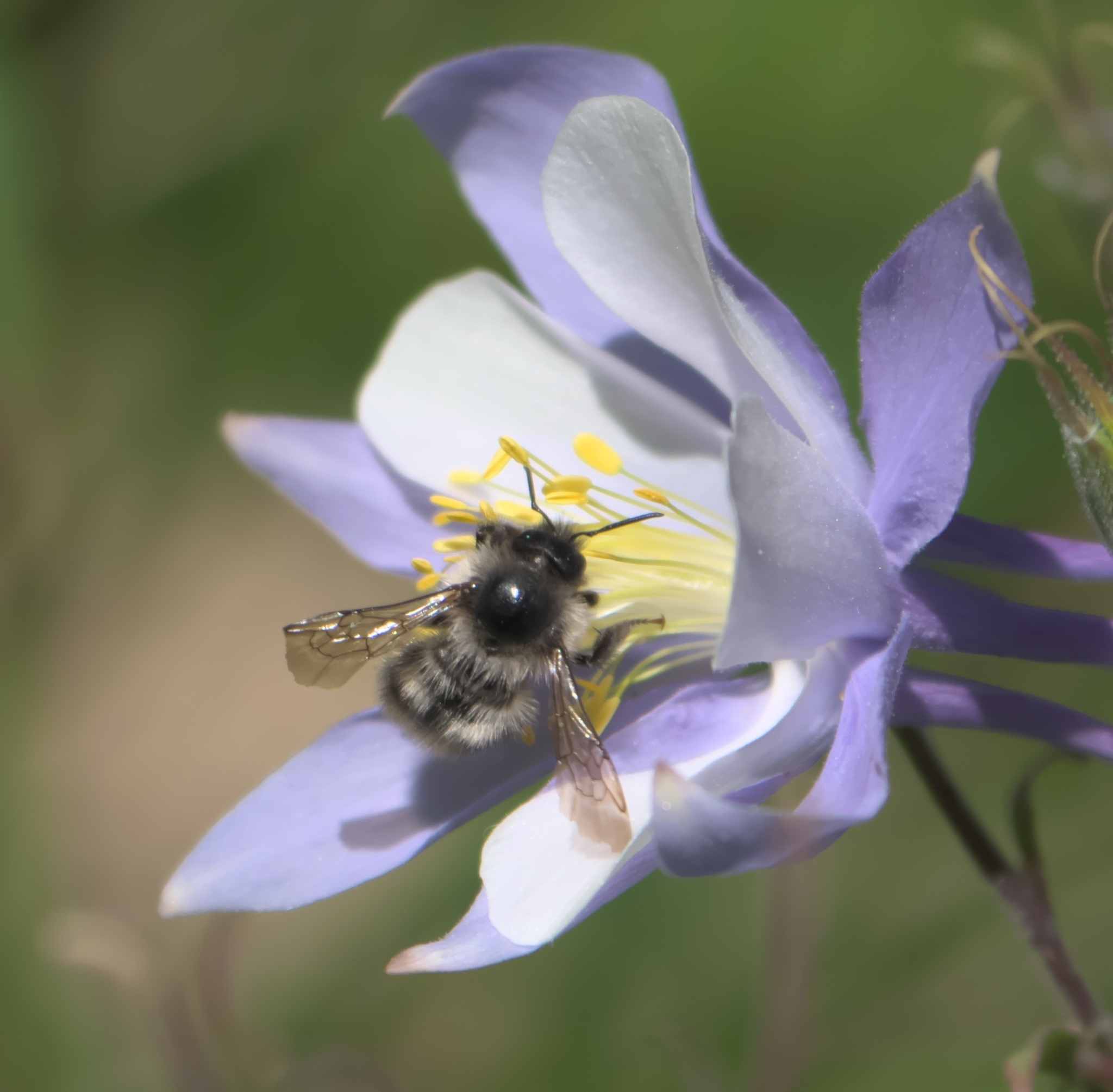
Bumblebee visiting flower, Sangre de Cristo Wilderness

Within its natural range Aquilegia coerulea is most often pollinated by hawkmoths (Sphingidae) and bumblebees (Bombus). Specific species of hawkmoth include Hyles lineata and Sphinx vashti. The bumblebees include Bombus appositus, but Bombus flavifrons visit the flowers much more frequently. Hawkmoths visit most often during the night while bumblebees only visit during daylight hours. The plants have the highest rate of cross-fertilization between plants in areas where the number of flowers is smaller and the population of hawkmoths is highest. Normally, only hawkmoths with their very long tongues are able access the nectar at the bottom of the very long spurs with bumblebees visiting primarily or only for pollen. Pale to white flowers pollinated by moths tend to have longer nectar spurs making nectar less available to bees.

The western bumblebee (Bombus occidentalis) has been observed nectar robbing from Aquilegia coerulea by opening or using holes cut in the spurs. Though prior to its decline in numbers in the 21st century they were also a significant pollinator of the species in some areas. The broad-tailed hummingbird also visit the blooms, but less frequently than moths or bees.

=== Conservation ===
The conservation organization NatureServe reviewed the species in 1991 and found it to be globally secure (G5) due to being a widespread species that is very common in some areas.They also rated it as apparently secure (S4) in both Colorado and Wyoming. However they also rated it vulnerable (S3) in Montana and Nevada and imperiled (S2) in Arizona. They did not evaluate the rest of its range. The wildflower authors Frank and John Craighead attributed a relative decline in the population of the species to overgrazing by sheep and cattle in 1963. Previously great numbers of the flowers were common with Payson writing in 1918:

While it is found in most of the Rocky Mountain states, it was chosen as the State flower of Colorado, and in that State it reaches its finest development. There, in the Canadian zone, among the aspens, spruces, and firs, it is not uncommon to see a hillside meadow so completely covered with A. caerulea as to hide all other vegetation and to make it seem a fairyland of huge, dancing, blue and white stars; nor is it a view soon to be forgotten.

== Uses ==
=== Culture ===
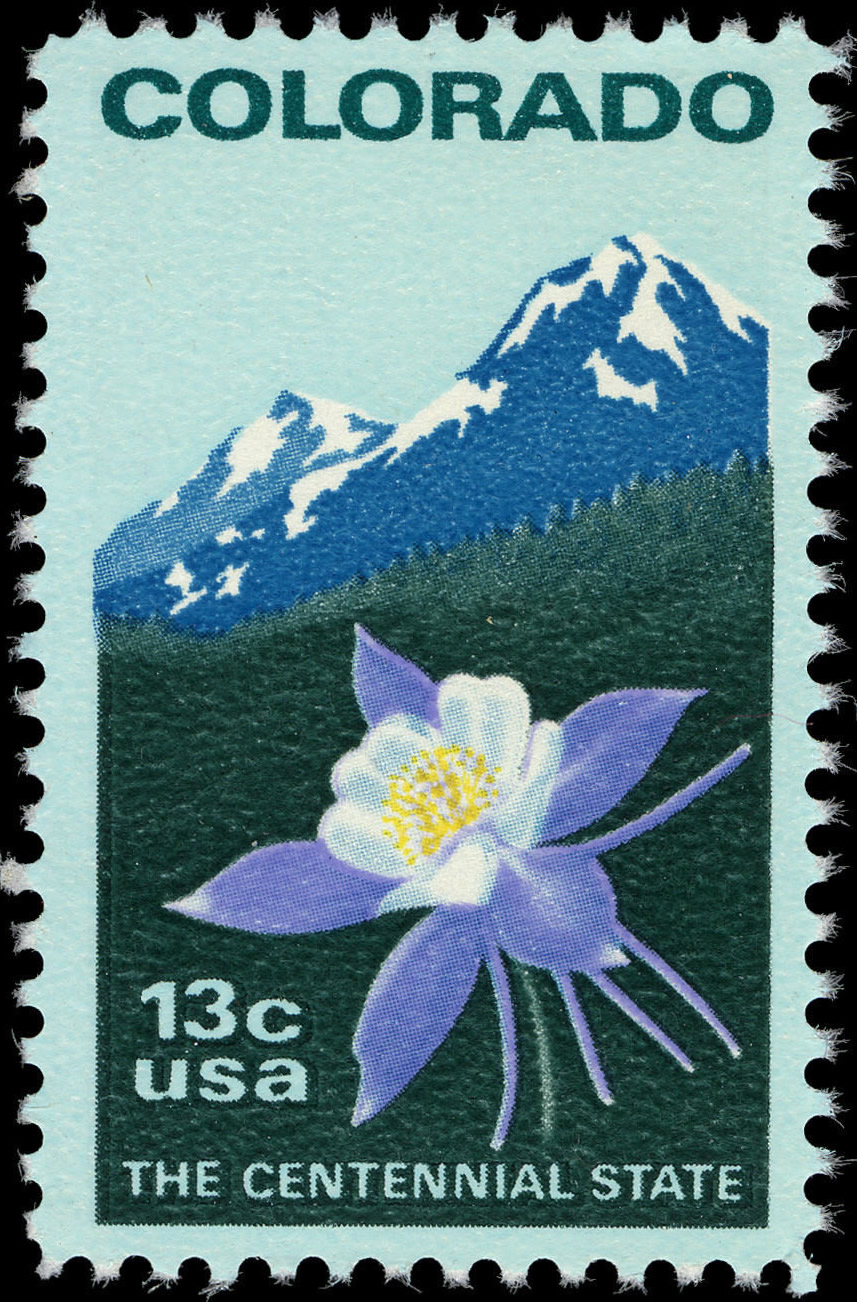
Colorado USPS stamp, 1977

Though it is not the standard form for a columbine, the long spurs and shape of the Colorado columbine's flower is the most recognized in the genus. The white and lavender variety of the columbine was officially instituted as the flower symbol of Colorado on 4 April 1899 by an act of the Colorado General Assembly. Prior to this school children in Colorado took a symbolic vote on Arbor Day in 1891 for a state flower, with the columbine winning by a large margin against other candidate flowers. In 1925 the species was protected by law in Colorado, preventing needless destruction or waste of the flowers. It prohibits the digging or uprooting Colorado columbine plants on public lands and prohibits picking more than twenty-five flowers, buds, or stems in one day. In 1930 Albert B. Sanford, Assistant Curator of History at the State Historical Society, wrote that the flower was chosen as the state flower with the blue representing the blue skies and, "the white represent the snowy ranges of the mountains, and the yellow, the gold that first attracted people here in 1858." Three airplanes used by Dwight D. Eisenhower, one as a General and the Columbine II and Columbine III as President, were named for the state flower of Colorado. The name was selected by Eisenhower's grandchildren because of the connections of his wife, Mamie Doud, to the state. When a commemorative stamp for Colorado's centennial was finally issued in 1977 it prominently featured a Colorado columbine. The flower is also depicted on road signs depicting Colorado Scenic Byways.

In the 1890s there was also a group called the Columbine Association that sought to establish it as a symbol of the United States. This campaign for the native columbines, including Colorado columbine and American columbine, to be the national flower continued through the end of the 1920s, but ultimately the rose was selected as the national flower of the United States in 1986. It is used in the logos of the American Society of Plant Taxonomists as well as the Colorado Native Plant Society.

Following the 1999 Columbine High School massacre in Columbine, Colorado, the columbine became a symbol of remembrance in Colorado. As of 2023, a specialty license plate depicting a columbine in honor of the victims and survivors of the massacre was the most popular specialty plate in Colorado.

In the traditional medicine of the Goshute people the seeds of Colorado columbine would provide a heart medicine. The seeds were chewed as a general medicine and a tea made from the roots was used for belly pain and for when patients were "sick all over".

=== Cultivation ===
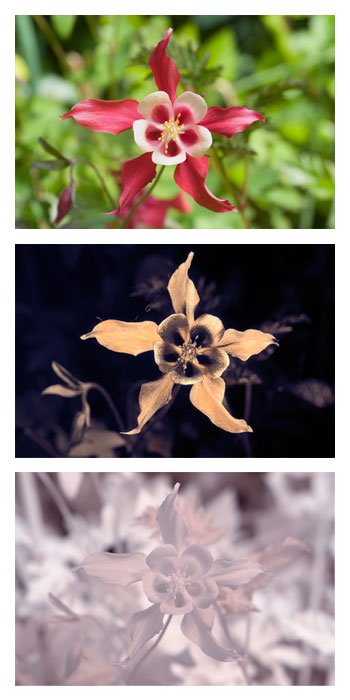
'Crimson star' in visible light, UV (showing nectar guides), and infrared

The Colorado columbine is regarded as a very attractive species. The botanist Edwin Blake Payson wrote 1918, "Aquilegia caerulea is without a doubt the most showy and splendid American species of this genus." It is used as an ornamental plant in gardens for cut flowers, in border beds, informal gardens, with roses or other shrubs, and in wildlife gardens. It is planted in American gardens for its attractiveness to hummingbirds. It is also recommended as an attractive plant for revegitation of mountain roadsides in its native range by the Office of Natural Environment in the Federal Highway Administration. The species was adopted as a garden plant very soon after its scientific description, with its introduction to the United Kingdom coming in 1864.

Colorado columbine is winter hardy in USDA zones 3–8, RHS zone H5. Plants in cultivation grow most successfully in average to medium garden soil that is well drained and even moisture. They may be grown by gardeners in full sun or partial shade, but plants grow best in light to moderate shade. Compared to other columbine species it is more tolerant of heat and drought, but is not as long lived in gardens. It is propagated both by seed and the division of plants. However, though plants divided in spring survive, they are slow to recover.

Colorado columbine is vulnerable to powdery mildews, particularly when its leaves are regularly wetted by overhead irrigation. It is also susceptible to infestation by aphids, though not more than other species of columbine. Plants can also be attacked by leaf-miner flies and sawflies. Compared to other columbines it is attacked more often by the columbine leafminer (Phytomyza aquilegivora). The damage is unsightly, but not does not threaten the health of a plant. They are tolerant of damage by deer and rabbits.

The treatment of seeds with gibberellic acid and planting at 21 °C (70 °F) results in 93% germination after three weeks. The seeds also display resistance to sprouting without treatment with none sprouting when planted at 21 °C and 40% germination after two weeks after first being cold stratified at 4.5 °C (40 °F). When grown in gardens plants will last three or four years a most and often are treated by gardeners like a biennial. When planting large areas it is seeded at a rate of 112 ounces per acre.

Its natural variability and ease of hybridization with other columbines is exploited in the selection of numerous cultivars in different shades. This is a drawback to gardeners seeking to have standard blue and white columbines, often requiring them to seek collected seeds rather than replanting. The cultivars that are probably entirely or largely derived from Rocky Mountain columbine include 'Alba', 'Albiflora', and 'Snow Queen'. Cultivars that are thought to be significantly of A. coerulea ancestry include 'crimson star' and 'rose queen'. The 'Origami' series of hybrids such as 'Origami Blue', 'Origami White', and 'Origami Yellow' are listed by authors such as P. Allen Smith and Allan Armitage as being largely derived from A. coerulea, but plant sellers will sometimes list them as Aquilegia vulgaris. The 'Origami' hybrids were originally developed by Goldsmith Seeds. Hybrids with large numbers of flowers are significantly shorter lived. The practice of deadheading, removing fading flowers to prevent the plant from growing seeds, is used by gardeners to extend a plant's life and partly compensates for this.

The genome of the 'Goldsmith' cultivar was sequenced as part of a study of the transfer of genes between columbine species and was later used to study the evolution of basal eudicots.
