= Rocky Mountain columbine =

Rocky Mountain columbine may refer to:

- Aquilegia coerulea, widespread blue species with straight spurs
- Aquilegia elegantula, widespread red species
- Aquilegia saximontana, blue species with hooked spurs
