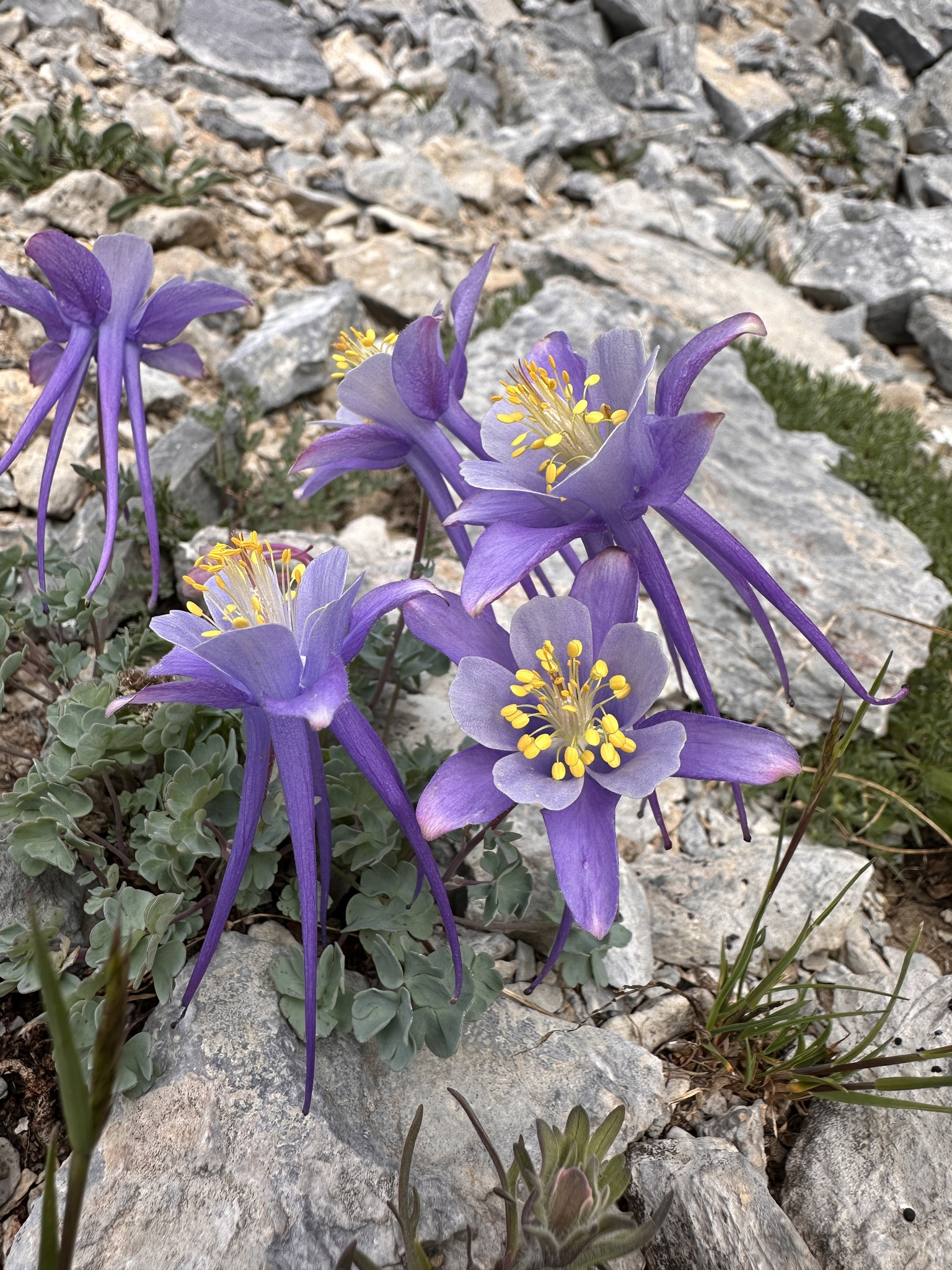
- Great Basin National Park, Nevada

Conservation status
- Vulnerable (NatureServe)

Scientific classification
- Kingdom: Plantae
- Clade: Tracheophytes
- Clade: Angiosperms
- Clade: Eudicots
- Order: Ranunculales
- Family: Ranunculaceae
- Genus: Aquilegia
- Species: A. scopulorum

Binomial name
- Aquilegia scopulorum Tidestr.

Varieties
- A. s. var. goodrichii; A. s. var. scopulorum

Synonyms
- List: Aquilegia coerulea var. calcarea M.E.Jones; Aquilegia scopulorum f. calcarea (M.E.Jones) Tidestr.; Aquilegia scopulorum var. calcarea (M.E.Jones) Munz; Aquilegia scopulorum subsp. perplexans Clokey

= Aquilegia scopulorum =

Plant species in the buttercup family

Aquilegia scopulorum, also known as rock columbine or Utah columbine, is a species of plant in the buttercup family from Nevada and Utah in the western United States.

== Description ==
Rock columbine is a herbaceous plant that is usually 5–30 centimeters (2–12 in) in height when fully grown, but occasionally is as tall as 40 cm (16 in). Stems and leaves sprout from thick, branched caudex that is covered in old leaf stems. The basal leaves, those sprouting directly from the base of the plant are bipinnate, doubly compound. They are always shorter than the flowering stems, spreading out to form a dense half globe. They usually are 2–11 centimeters (0.8–4.3 in) in length, but occasionally as much as 22 cm (8.7 in). The individual leaflets are crowded together and overlap. The leaves are somewhat blue in color, in comparison to the green leaves of Rocky Mountain columbine (Aquilegia coerulea). The leaflets are not sticky and are hairless on both sides, but the primary petioles, the main leaf stems, can be smooth or covered in fine hairs.

Plants can have multiple flowering stems or just one with or without branches. Stems are topped with one or more large and attractive flowers, with a range of colors possible from vivid flax-blue to white or reddish purple. The spreading sepals are ovate-oblong, halfway between egg shaped and a rounded rectangle, and measure 13–22 millimeters (0.5–0.9 in) long by 4–10 millimeters wide. The five petals are 8–14 mm by 4-7 mm, but with slender spurs that measure 2.5 to 4 centimeters (1 to 1.5 in) long. The face of the petals can be yellow in addition to the same colors as the sepals and spurs.

The fruits are clusters of multiple follicles, most commonly four or five, but as many as ten. They are upright and spread outwards at the tips. They measure 1.5 to 2.2 centimeters (0.6 to 0.9 in) long. Inside the capsules the seeds are shiny and black with three angles, each 1.9–2.3 mm long.

== Taxonomy ==
Part of what is accepted as Aquilegia scopulorum was scientifically described by as a variety of Aquilegia coerulea named calcarea in 1895 by Marcus E. Jones. It was described as a species by Ivar Tidestrom in 1910 with the variety described by Jones described as a form of the wider species. Tidestrom recorded the location of the type specimen as a gravelly slope on Wasatch Peak, though the location is probably Heliotrope Mountain.

Closest relatives of A. scopulorum

- - A. scopulorum
  - - A. pubescens
    - - A. eximia
      - - A. flavescens
        - A. formosa
- A. chrysantha
- - A. longissima
  - A. skinneri
  - - A. elegantula
    - A. coerulea

Part of the phylogeny of the genus Aquilegia, based on Fior et al. 2013.

It is listed as an accepted species of plant in genus Aquilegia in the family Ranunculaceae by POWO, World Flora Online (WFO), and World Plants. Aquilegia scopulorum is a part of genus Aquilegia in family Ranunculaceae. A 2013 study of columbines found that the species is most closely related to a group of columbines including Aquilegia eximia, Aquilegia flavescens, and Aquilegia formosa rather than to A. coerulea. Based on the pink tinge to some of the flowers on the West Tavaputs Plateau there may be some gene flow with Aquilegia barnebyi found at lower elevations.

=== Varieties ===
According to POWO it has two varieties, but World Plants lists three accepted varieties. The WFO lists all as synonyms and the Flora of North America (FNA) likewise lists no valid varieties for the species. World Plants additionally lists the variety calcarea described by Jones and revised by Philip A. Munz in 1946 as valid. The Natural Resources Conservation Service (NRCS) also lists it as valid, but not goodrichii. If either of these are accepted it means there is an autonym created named variety scopulorum.

==== Aquilegia scopulorum var. goodrichii ====
This variety was described in 2003 by Stanley Larson Welsh. It is known by the common name Goodrich columbine. The variety is found on the West Tavaputs Plateau, a part of the larger Colorado Plateau in the southern part of Duchesne County, Utah. It has very long spurs, 35 to 50 millimeters (1.5 to 2 in), and its sepals and spurs are very pale blue or white, occasionally somewhat pink.

==== Aquilegia scopulorum var. scopulorum ====
The autonymic variety of the species is found throughout the rest of the range of the species except on Tavaputs Plateau and is known by the same name as the species as a whole, rock columbine. Its spurs are usually much shorter, just 22 to 36 millimeters (0.9 to 1.4 in), though they can occasionally be as long as 42 mm (1.7 in). Its sepals and spurs are normally blue and only rarely white.

=== Names ===
In English Aquilegia scopulorum is known by the common names of rock columbine or Utah columbine. It is also has been known as blue columbine, however Aquilegia coerulea is known by this name.

== Range and habitat ==
Rock columbine definitely grows in the states of Nevada and Utah. The NRCS also lists it as growing in Wyoming and Colorado, but according to FNA the Wyoming record is doubtful. According to the NCRS it grows in seven counties in central and western Utah. In Nevada it is recorded in Clark, Nye, Lander, and White Pine counties. They grow at elevations between 2,000 and 3,500 meters (6,600 and 11,500 ft).

They grow on alpine slopes and in scree, the broken rocks at the base of cliffs. They can also be found in subalpine areas amid ponderosa pines and bristlecone pines in areas of broken shale.

== Cultivation ==
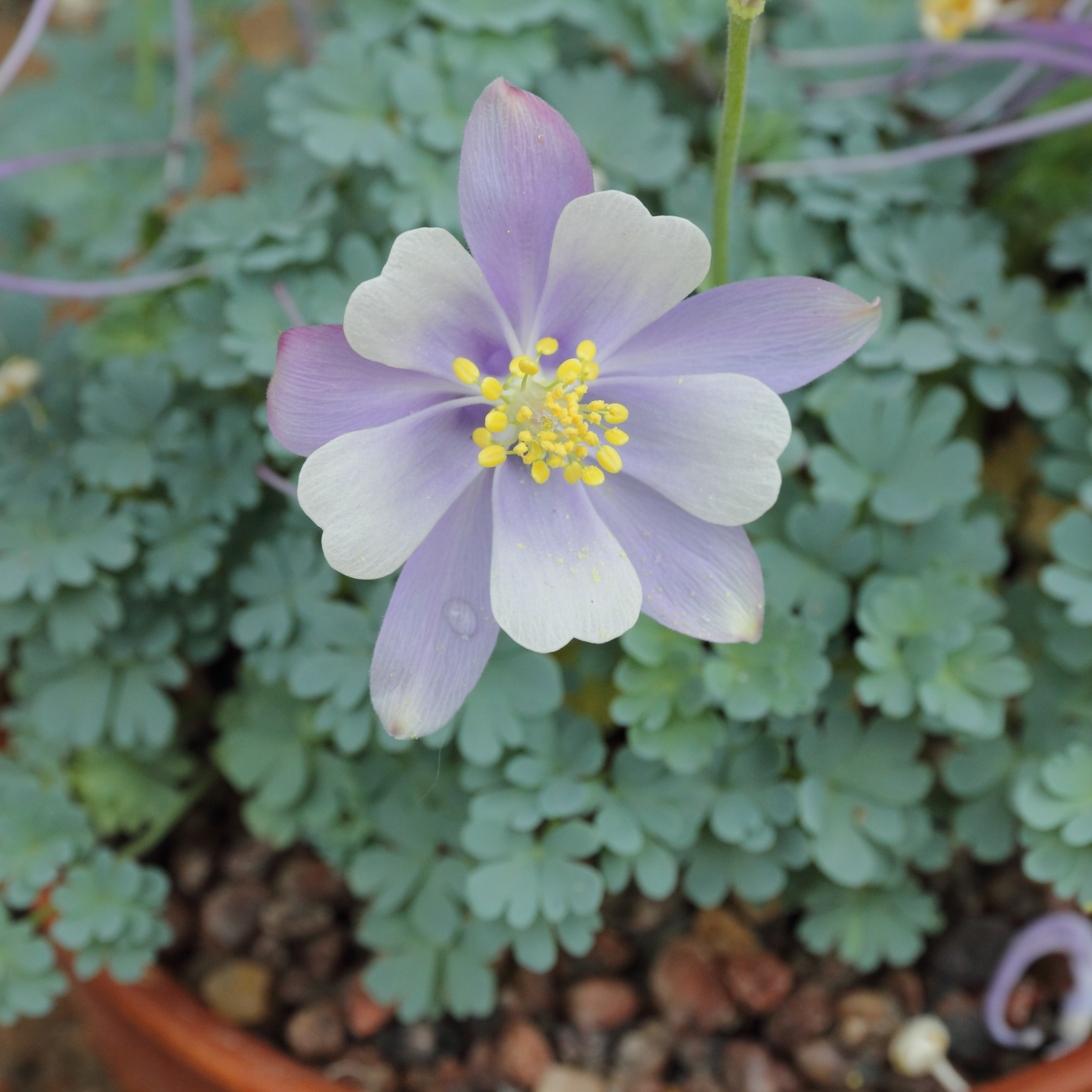
Flower blooming in a pot, Gothenburg Botanical Garden, Sweden

The rock gardening expert and writer Robert Nold praised rock columbine writing, "In its time, in full flower, this is possibly the most beautiful plant in the rock garden." Similarly to other alpine species grown in gardens, it is planted in deep scree, a mixture of equal parts of small gravel, sand, and garden loam. However, it is adaptable to a large range of soil textures provided they are well drained, even clay soils if occasionally dry. Rock columbine is intolerant of hot and humid summer conditions. In garden conditions it will rebloom with a smaller number of flowers in the summer after a main bloom in the spring. It is hardy in USDA zones 3–8.

Initially it was grown by Carleton Worth in the 1950s, but was only available as a hybrid with other species by the 1960s. It was reintroduced to the plant trade by Panayoti Kelaidis and Gwen Kelaidis in 1989.
