= Blue columbine =

Blue columbine may refer to:

- Aquilegia coerulea (more often)
- Aquilegia brevistyla (infrequently)
- Aquilegia scopulorum (infrequently)
