= William Casselman =

William Casselman may refer to:

- William H. Casselman (1868–1941), Canadian politician
- William E. Casselman II (born 1941), American attorney, Counsel to the President under Gerald Ford, 1974–1975
- Bill Casselman (William Allen Casselman, born 1941), American Canadian mathematician
- Bill Casselman (writer) (William Gordon Casselman, born 1942), Canadian writer and broadcaster
