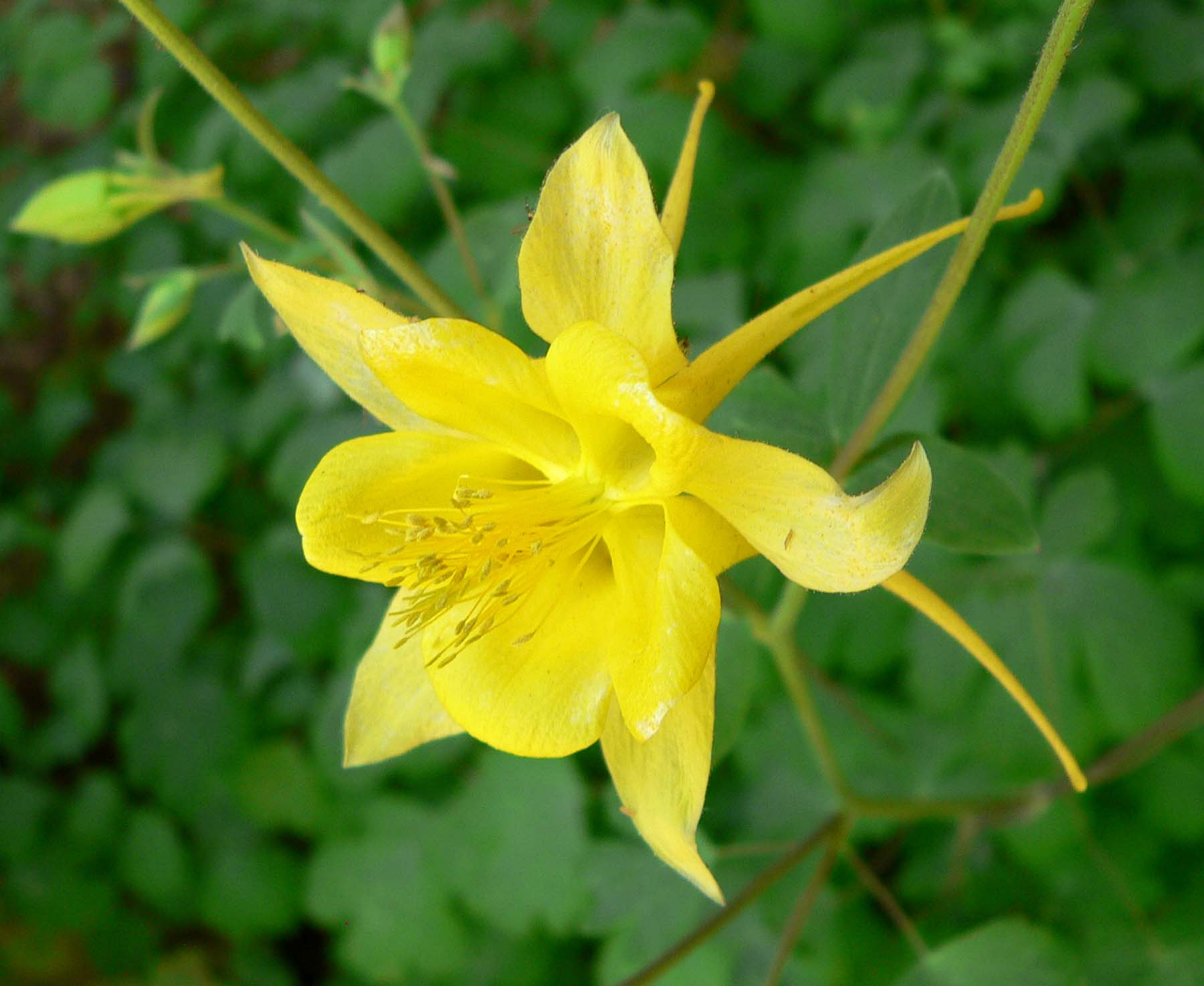

Scientific classification
- Kingdom: Plantae
- Clade: Tracheophytes
- Clade: Angiosperms
- Clade: Eudicots
- Order: Ranunculales
- Family: Ranunculaceae
- Genus: Aquilegia
- Species: A. chrysantha

Binomial name
- Aquilegia chrysantha A.Gray

Synonyms
- List: Aquilegia coerulea var. chrysantha (A.Gray) Rapaics; Aquilegia formosa var. chrysantha (A.Gray) Brühl; Aquilegia leptoceras var. chrysantha (A.Gray) Hook.f.; Aquilegia chrysantha f. pleiocalcarata B.Boivin; Aquilegia chrysantha var. rydbergii Munz; Aquilegia leptoceras var. flava A.Gray; Aquilegia leptoceras var. lutea Mast. & T.Moore; Aquilegia thalictrifolia Rydb.

= Aquilegia chrysantha =

Species of flowering plant

Aquilegia chrysantha, the golden columbine, is a perennial herbaceous flowering plant native to the southwestern United States and northwestern Mexico. The plant, with a height of between 40 centimetres (16 in) and 120 centimetres (47 in), has yellow flowers. A. chrysantha. as with other members of the Aquilegia coerulea species complex, is evolved for pollination by hawkmoth. It favors moist environments in its mountainous range.

In gardens, a cultivar of the species known as 'Yellow Queen' is known for its appearance and won the Royal Horticultural Society's Award of Garden Merit. Hybrids utilizing A. chrysantha, particularly those with Aquilegia coerulea, are especially popular. Both wild and cultivated A. chrysantha, known for their large flowers, require moist and well-drained soil.

== Description ==
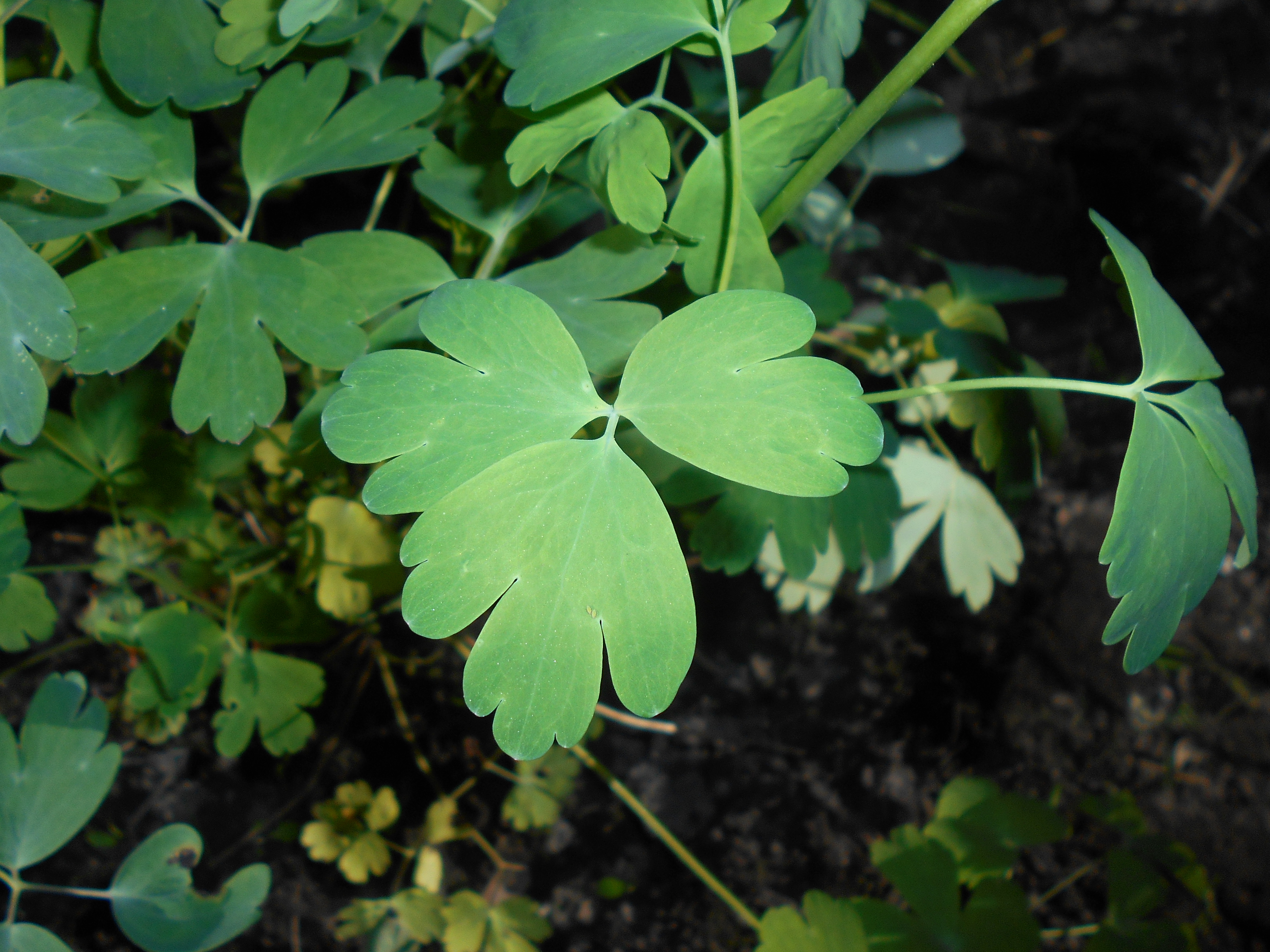
Leaves of A. chrysantha

The ferny leaves have three leaflets with three lobes and grow from the base and off the flowering stems. The flowers grow on a long stem above the leaves and have five pointed yellow sepals and five yellow petals with long spurs of around 6.7 cm (2.6 in) projecting backwards between the sepals. Its sepals of 20 millimetres (0.79 in) to 35 millimetres (1.4 in) can be spreading, lanceolate, or somewhat oval. At the center of the flower are many yellow stamens. The height of the plant's flowering stems range from 40 centimetres (16 in) to 120 centimetres (47 in) tall. Flowers are golden yellow.

At the earliest, the plant achieves maturity in two years under cultivation. It is polycarpic, dropping seeds several times during its lifespan, which is longer than other Aquilegia species. Breeding is performed through its unisexual flowers, meaning that individual flowers exclusively possess either stamen or carpels, making it monoecious. A. chrysantha is similar to the also yellow Aquilegia flavescens but the former is more resistant to droughts and blooms longer. Pollination is primarily performed by moths, butterflies, and bees. Blooming occurs April and September, with a peak varying between late spring and late summer.

The plant needs moist, well-drained areas to succeed. Poor drainage can cause the root crown to rot. Excessive heat increases the plant's risk to aphids and spider mites. Overly warm periods can result in the plant going dormant.

In the variety hinckleyana, leaves grow into two parts and pedal blades range between only 2 centimetres (0.79 in) long and 16 millimetres (0.63 in) wide. In wild specimens observed in southern Arizona during May and June 1980, plants generally exhibited a faint scent. One plant observed during that period was found with the same pattern of pink sepals and spurs with yellow pedals as found in certain Aquilegia micrantha populations of Colorado and Utah.

== Taxonomy ==
Aquilegia chrysantha is part of the Aquilegia coerulea species complex adapted for hawkmoth pollination. Both species are native to the western United States and evolved to have longer nectar spurs than those on eastern U.S. hummingbird-pollinated species as hawkmoths have longer tongues than hummingbirds. A. chrysantha belongs to a likely monophyletic group with the other North American columbine species, which diverged from their closest relatives in East Asia in the mid-Pliocene around 3.8 million years ago. North of the Grand Canyon, A. chrysantha intergrades with A. coerulea var. pinetorum. In Texas, A. chrysantha intergrades with Aquilegia longissima.

The species was first assigned the binomial nomenclature Aquilegia chrysantha in 1873. Its type locality is in the Organ Mountains of New Mexico.

The closely related Aquilegia chaplinei is considered a dwarf version of A. chrysantha that is better suited to arid environments. In 1985, Emily J. Lott proposed reclassifying A. chaplinei as Aquilegia chrysantha var. chaplinei in the journal Phytologia. Lott's proposal came out of her study of plants in the Chihuahuan Desert, stemming from her 1979 unpublished master's thesis on Aquilegia in the Trans-Pecos region of Texas. The name proposed by Lott was not broadly accepted outside of Texas, where it is used by the Lady Bird Johnson Wildflower Center of the University of Texas at Austin.

The nectar spurs present Aquilegia species are an unusual evolutionary trait. The genus has radiated widely since its relatively recent origin. In order to determine the gene responsible for the trait, a 2020 paper by researchers from the University of California, Santa Barbara, Harvard University, and Stanford University utilized A. chrysantha (alongside A. coerulea, Aquilegia formosa, and Aquilegia sibirica) as a spurred Aquilegia taxa to compare against the sole spurless Aquilegia species, Aquilegia ecalcarata. This research identified a gene named POPVICH (POP) as responsible for cell proliferation during the early stage of spur development. POP appeared at higher levels in the pedals of the spurred Aquilegia studied than those of the spurless A. ecalcarata.

=== Etymology ===
The word columbine derives from the Latin word columbinus, meaning "dove", a reference to the flowers' appearance of a group of doves. The genus name Aquilegia comes from the Latin word for "eagle", aquila, in reference to the pedals' resemblance to eagle talons. The specific epithet chrysantha is Latin for "golden-flowered".

== Distribution and habitat ==
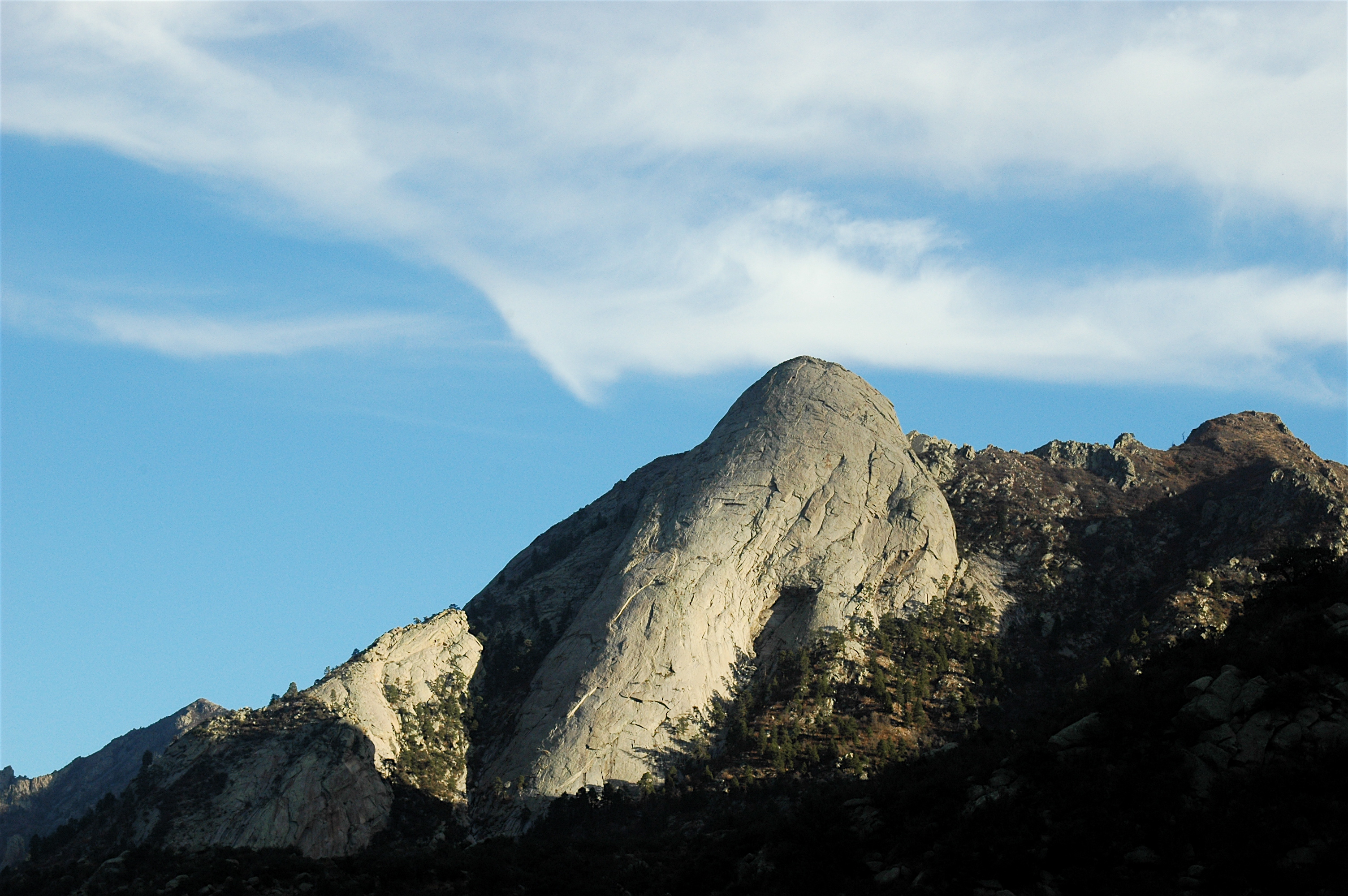
The Organ Mountains in New Mexico, where A. chrysantha's type locality is

The species is native to the southwestern United States from extreme southern Utah to Texas, including Arizona, Colorado, and New Mexico, and to Sonora, Chihuahua, Coahuila, and Nuevo Leon in northwestern Mexico. It grows in moist habitats in mountainous regions. The plant's native elevation range is between 910 metres (2,990 ft) and 3,350 metres (10,990 ft) above sea level.

The population of A. chrysantha in south-central Colorado is unusually disjunct from the rest of the species's range. This population usually possess smaller flowers. They have sepals extending only 10 millimetres (0.39 in) to 18 millimetres (0.71 in) long and spurs only 35 millimetres (1.4 in) to 40 millimetres (1.6 in) long. This population is sometimes recognized as a separate variety, A. chrysantha var. rydbergii, but this distinction is not recognized in the Flora of North America.

In 1881, botanist Thomas Meehan noted the apparent proliferation of A. chysantha in the Colorado Springs area, particularly around Cheyenne Cañon and Glen Eyrie, since botanists had examined the area in 1871 and 1873. Meehan theorized that their rapid spread was partially due to the increased human habitation of the area altering environmental circumstance.

A population of columbines from the Baboquivari Mountains of southern Arizona has been the subject of debate regarding its speciation. While occasionally described as a variety of A. chrysantha, it has also been classified as part of the species A. longissima.

== Cultivation ==
A. chrysantha succeeds well in a variety of soils when provided adequate moisture, drainage, and shade. It is recognized for its large flowers, is the parent to a number of garden hybrids. Some, such as the white 'Alba', were given pseudo-botanical names in the 19th century. Additionally, from the Baboquivari population have been collected and privately cultivated.

The cultivar 'Yellow Queen' has gained the Royal Horticultural Society's Award of Garden Merit. Often sold as A. chrysantha, 'Yellow Queen' is recognized for its massive yellow flowers and long life. 'Yellow Queen' has a tendency to produce more flowers than the standard A. chrysantha. The cultivar prefers moist, well-drained soil of clay, sand, or loam. Flowers bloom May and June in the northern hemisphere, with darker yellow center pedals.

Crosses between A. coerulea and A. chrysantha – and possibly A. formosa for the addition of red – are considered the most valuable hybrids. Showing characteristics of both species, they possess relatively short lifespans. Seed availability of these plants is relatively high in North America. Aquilegia x jaeschkanii, thought to be a cross between A. chrysantha and Aquilegia skinneri, is a less valued hybrid.

In 1916, botanist Theodore D. A. Cockerell described an F1 hybrid that his wife, Wilmatte P. Cockerell, had made between A. chrysantha and Aquilegia desertorum. He observed that the coloration and time of flowering were both indeterminate. The flowers of F1 A. desertorum x chrysantha, though less reminiscent of the parent species and more characteristic of species in the Aquilegia vulgaris group, had a width more typical of A. chrysantha. He also noted the longstanding presence of A. chrysantha x A. coerulea hybrids in gardens; this hybrid's flowers are paler than A. coerulea with yellow coloring.

== Ecology ==
Aquilegia chrysantha flowers in May and early June. It is chiefly pollinated by the hawkmoth species Eumorpha achemon, the Achemon sphinx moth, and also by moths of the Sphinx genus. It is occasionally visited by large bees and hummingbirds.

== Conservation ==
As of October 2024, NatureServe did not give a worldwide or United States-wide conservation status for A. chrysantha. In individual states, it is listed as Critically Imperiled (S1) in Utah, Imperiled (S2) in Colorado and Nevada, Vulnerable (S3) in Arizona and New Mexico, and is given no status rank (SNR) in Texas.
