= Red columbine =

Red columbine can refer to any red-flowered species in the flowering plant genus Aquilegia, especially:

- Aquilegia canadensis (Canadian columbine)
- Aquilegia elegantula (western red columbine)
- Aquilegia formosa (crimson columbine), in particular variety truncata
