= William E. Casselman II =

American lawyer

Bill Casselman

Personal details
- Born: 1941
- Died: September 10, 2018 (aged 76–77) Aldie, Virginia
- Party: Republican
- Education: Claremont McKenna College (BA); George Washington University (JD)

William E. Casselman II (1941– September 10, 2018) was an American attorney who served as counsel to Gerald Ford both in his time as vice president and after his elevation to the presidency.

He was initially from Chicago. Casselman attended George Washington University's law school and passed the Virginia bar exam in 1968.

In 1969, he was dubbed the Nixon administration's "Patronage Chief" by the Washington Post when he was sent to work as assistant to Nixon staffer Harry S. Flemming after the administration's attempt to hire political appointees became "snarled," according to the New York Times.

Prior to his service in Ford's vice presidential office, he was general counsel of the General Services Administration.

After leaving government service, he founded a law firm in Washington, D.C.

He died September 10, 2018 in Aldie, Virginia of cancer.
