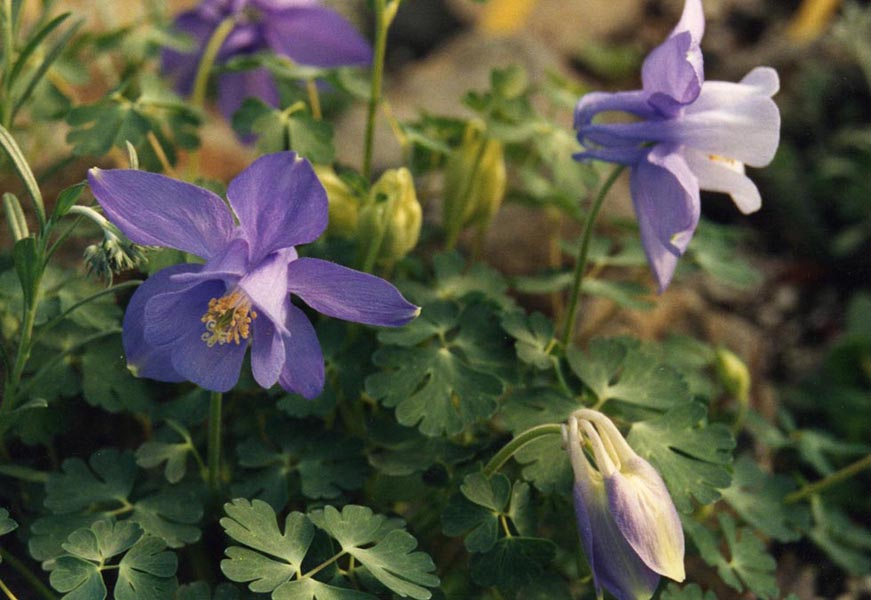

Conservation status
- Vulnerable (NatureServe)

Scientific classification
- Kingdom: Plantae
- Clade: Embryophytes
- Clade: Tracheophytes
- Clade: Angiosperms
- Clade: Eudicots
- Order: Ranunculales
- Family: Ranunculaceae
- Genus: Aquilegia
- Species: A. saximontana

Binomial name
- Aquilegia saximontana Rydb.

Synonyms
- Aquilegia brevistyla var. leicocarpa

= Aquilegia saximontana =

Alpine North American species of columbine

Aquilegia saximontana, the alpine dwarf columbine, dwarf blue columbine, or alpine columbine, is a perennial plant that comes from the buttercup family. This plant species is native to just the US state of Colorado.

== Description ==
A. saximontana can be found in sub-alpine and alpine areas at elevations of 3,300–4,000 m (10,800–13,100 ft) in the Rocky Mountains. This species of columbine blooms in July and August. The blooms are lavender and white, and the entire plant reaches 5–25 cm (2.0–9.8 in) in height.

A. saximontana should not be confused with Aquilegia coerulea var. coerulea, which overlaps in range and may also have blue and white flowers. They can be identified by comparing the length of the "spur"-shaped backs of the flowers; A. saximontana has hooked spurs 3–9 mm (0.12–0.35 in) long, while A. coerulea has straight spurs 34–48 mm (1.3–1.9 in) in length.

== Taxonomy ==
Aquilegia saximontana was scientifically described and named by Per Axel Rydberg in 1895. It is classified in the genus Aquilegia within the family Ranunculaceae. It has one heterotypic synonym, Aquilegia brevistyla var. leicocarpa, created by Paul Johannes Brühl in 1893.

=== Names ===
The botanical name saximontana means 'Rocky Mountains'. Aquilegia saximontana is known by the common names Rocky Mountain columbine or Rocky Mountain blue columbine, however the Colorado columbine (Aquilegia coerulea) which also grows in Colorado is very frequently called Rocky Mountain columbine. The species is also known as dwarf blue columbine, but shares this name with rock columbine (Aquilegia scopulorum). It is also known as alpine blue columbine and simply dwarf columbine.

== Range and habitat ==
Alpine blue columbine is endemic to the Rocky Mountains in the north central part of the state. It has been recorded in eight counties, Larimer, Boulder, Gilpin, Jefferson, Clear Creek, Summit, Park, and El Paso. It is found above 3,300 meters (10,800 ft) in elevation to as high as 4,000 meters (13,000 ft).

== See also ==
- Ecology of the Rocky Mountains
