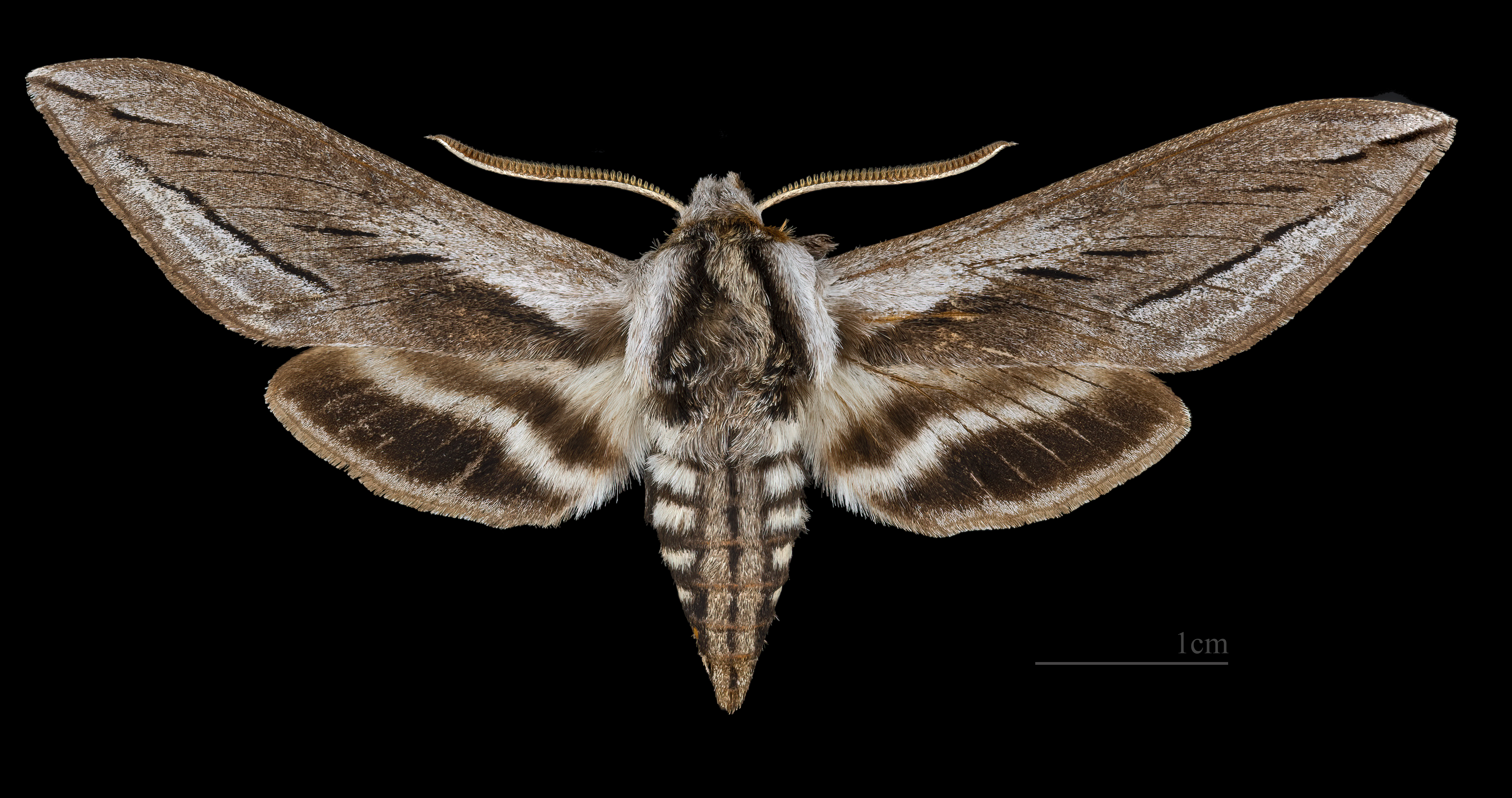
- Sphinx vashti ♂
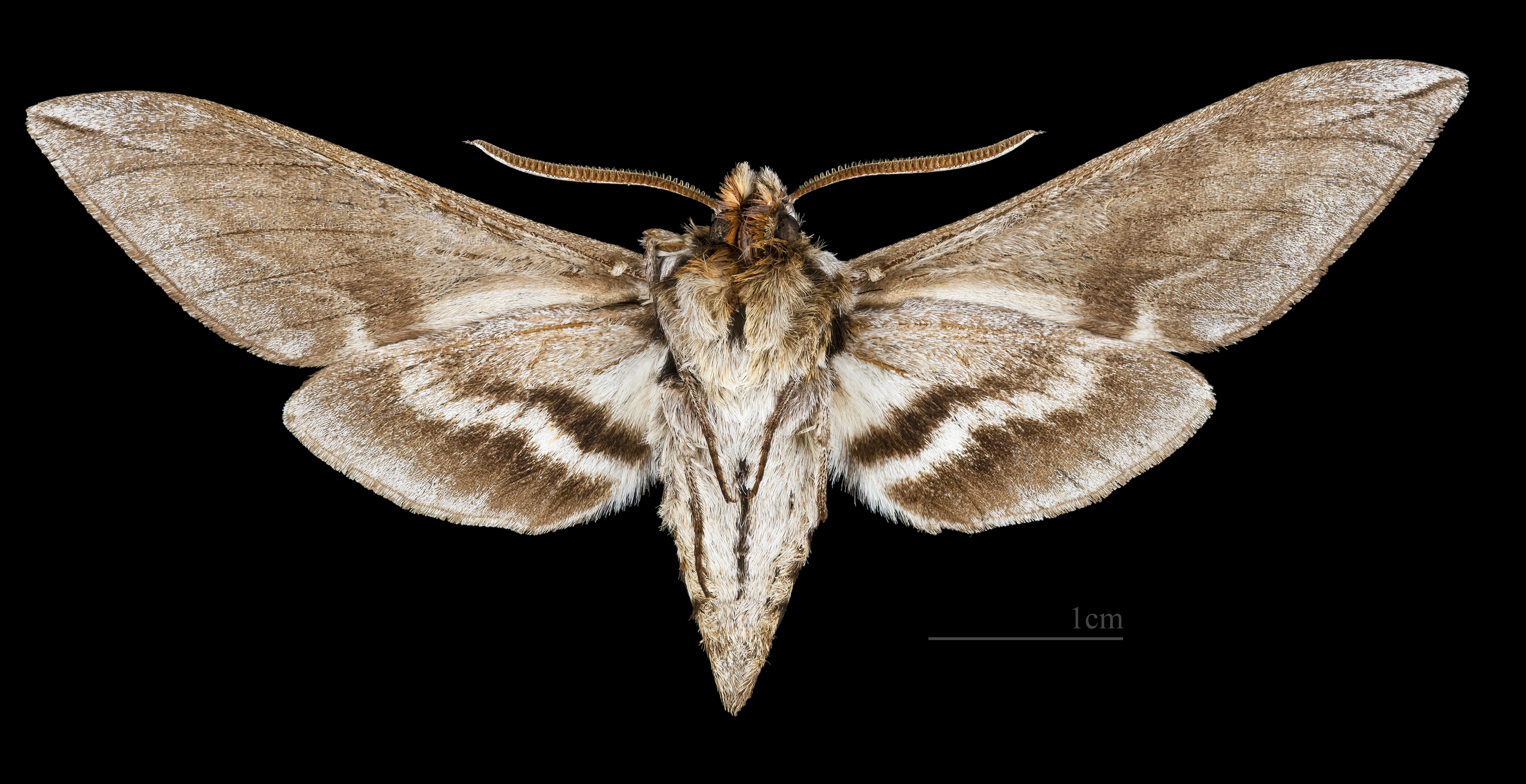
- Sphinx vashti ♂ △

Scientific classification
- Domain: Eukaryota
- Kingdom: Animalia
- Phylum: Arthropoda
- Class: Insecta
- Order: Lepidoptera
- Family: Sphingidae
- Genus: Sphinx
- Species: S. vashti

Binomial name
- Sphinx vashti Strecker, 1878

Synonyms
- Hyloicus gerhardi Barnes & Benjamin, 1924; Sphinx albescens Tepper, 1881; Sphinx mordecai McDunnough, 1923

= Sphinx vashti =

Vashti sphinx

Species of moth

Sphinx vashti, the Vashti sphinx, is a member of the family Sphingidae of moths. It is found in North America from British Columbia east to Manitoba, south to southern California, Nevada, central Arizona, New Mexico and western Texas.

The pattern and wing length are highly variable. The forewing ranges from pale to very dark gray with paler gray at the base of the costa, the wing tip, and on the outer margin. A series of black dashes ends with the topmost one reaching the wing tip. The hindwing is black with white bands. There is one brood per year.

The larvae feed on snowberry (Symphoricarpos albus) and coralberry (Symphoricarpos orbiculatus).
