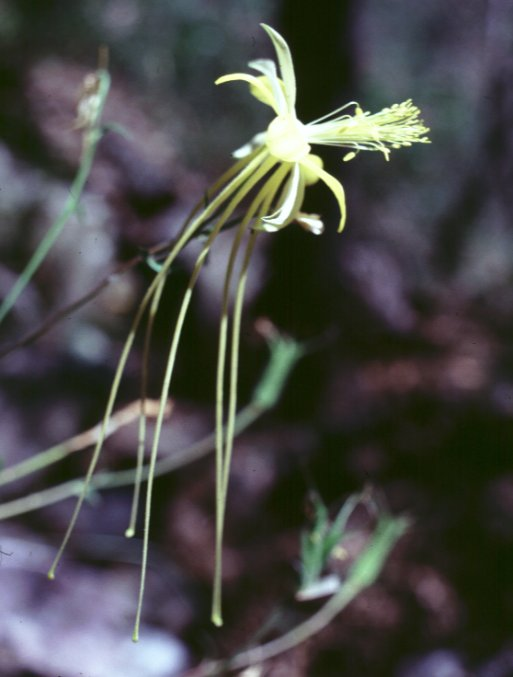

Conservation status
- Vulnerable (NatureServe)

Scientific classification
- Kingdom: Plantae
- Clade: Tracheophytes
- Clade: Angiosperms
- Clade: Eudicots
- Order: Ranunculales
- Family: Ranunculaceae
- Genus: Aquilegia
- Species: A. longissima

Binomial name
- Aquilegia longissima A.Gray ex S.Watson

Synonyms
- Aquilegia coerulea f. longissima (A.Gray) Rapaics

= Aquilegia longissima =

North American species of columbine

Aquilegia longissima, the long-spur columbine or long-spurred columbine, is a rare perennial flowering plant in the family Ranunculaceae that is native to northern Mexico, Texas, and Arizona.

== Description ==
Aquilegia longissima grows to 25–90 cm (9.8–35.4 in) tall, with biternate basal leaves measuring 20–45 cm (7.9–17.7 in) across, usually shorter than the stems. The flowers are erect with pale yellow lanceolate sepals of 25–40 mm (0.98–1.57 in) length, spreading at right angles to the petals. The petals are yellow, spoon-shaped, and 15–30 mm (0.59–1.18 in) long.

The most remarkable feature of the species is the extremely long nectar spurs, measuring 72–180 mm (2.8–7.1 in), straight, evenly tapered, and very slender in shape, and usually hanging straight down. They are the longest spurs of any eudicot.

== Taxonomy ==
In the original species description by Asa Gray in 1883, Aquilegia longissima is distinguished from the shorter-spurred golden columbine Aquilegia chrysantha by the narrow spatulate petals and long, slender spurs hanging straight down.

The species is part of a clade containing all the North American species of columbines, that likely split from their closest relatives in East Asia in the mid-Pliocene, approximately 3.84 million years ago.

=== Etymology ===
The specific epithet longissima means "longest" in Latin, referring to the unusual size of the nectar spurs.

== Distribution and habitat ==
Aquilegia longissima is native to Trans-Pecos Texas and southern Arizona in the United States and Chihuahua, Coahuila, Nuevo León, and Sonora in northern Mexico. It grows at altitudes of 1,370–1,520 m (4,490–4,990 ft) in gravelly limestone or igneous soils, on canyon walls, and along streams, drainages, springs, or waterfalls, within shady, mesic canyons of pine-oak or pine-oak-juniper woodlands.

== Ecology ==
Aquilegia longissima flowers from July to September.

William Trelease hypothesized in 1883 that the most likely pollinator of A. longissima would be the giant sphinx moth, Cocytius antaeus. The giant sphinx moth is a rare stray in west Texas and has been collected in Big Bend National Park near long-spur columbine populations; however, the common pollinators are likely large hawkmoths in the genera Manduca and Agrius with tongue lengths from 9–14 cm (3.5–5.5 in) long.

Hybridization is common among columbines and populations with intermediate spur lengths from 7–9 cm (2.8–3.5 in) are found near some long-spur columbine populations. One such population is found at Cattail Falls in Big Bend National Park, a site significantly impacted by human visitation.

== Conservation ==
As of November 2024, NatureServe listed Aquilegia longissima as Vulnerable (G3) worldwide. This status was last reviewed on 19 November 1997. In individual states, it is listed as Imperiled (S2) in Texas and has no status rank in Arizona. It has not been assessed for the IUCN Red List.
