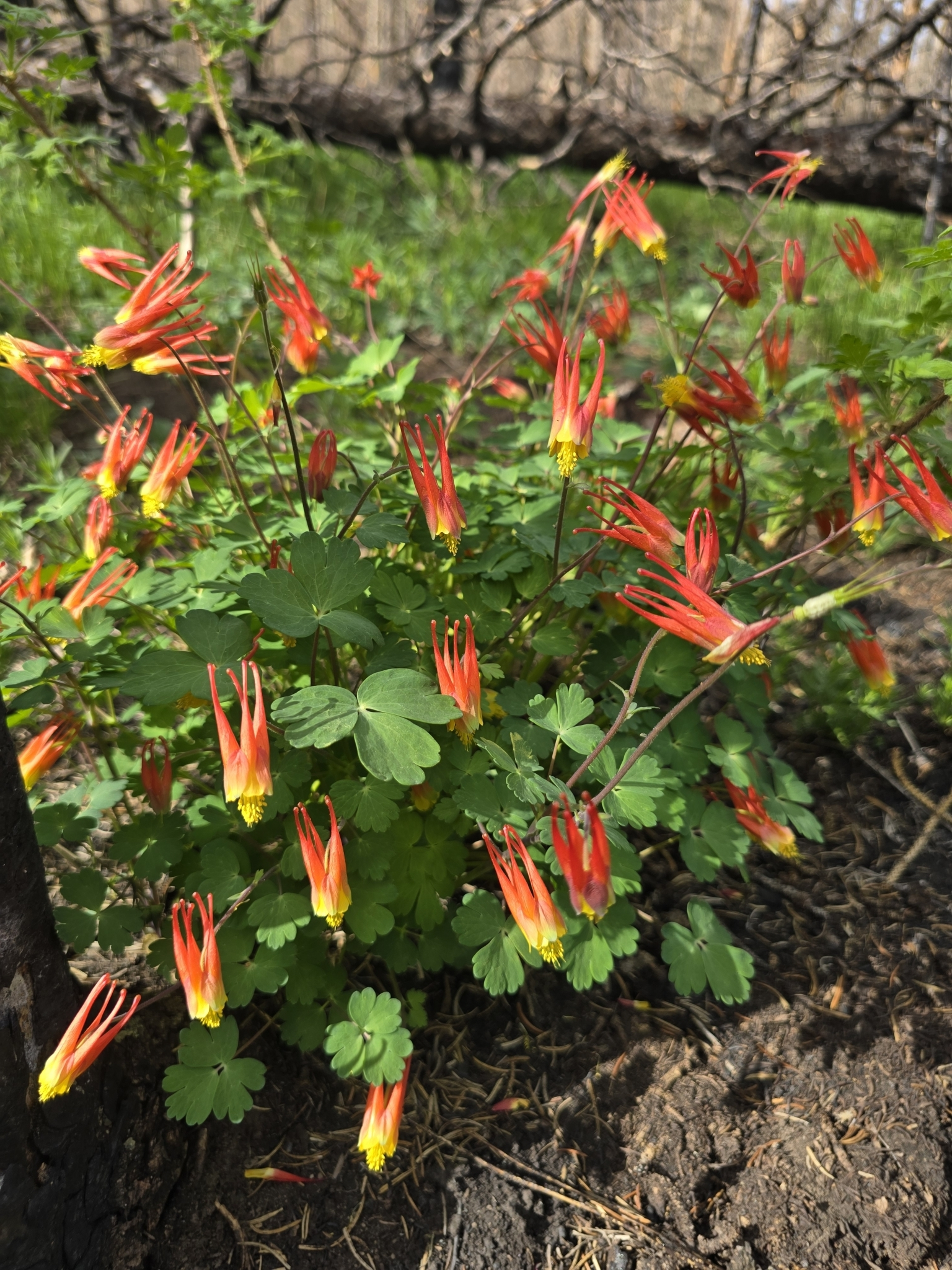
- Carson National Forest, New Mexico

Conservation status
- Secure (NatureServe)

Scientific classification
- Kingdom: Plantae
- Clade: Tracheophytes
- Clade: Angiosperms
- Clade: Eudicots
- Order: Ranunculales
- Family: Ranunculaceae
- Genus: Aquilegia
- Species: A. elegantula

Binomial name
- Aquilegia elegantula Greene

Synonyms
- Aquilegia canadensis var. fendleri

= Aquilegia elegantula =

North American species of columbine

Aquilegia elegantula, the western red columbine, is a perennial species of flowering plant in the buttercup family, native to the Southwestern United States and northern Mexico.

== Description ==
Aquilegia elegantula is a perennial herb that can grow 10 to 60 centimeters (4 to 23.5 in) tall, however it is more often is 24 to 42 cm (9.5 to 16.5 in). The plant grows its basal leaves and stems from a caudex that may or may not be branched. The stems can be hairless or pilose, covered in long, straight, soft hairs, but do not have glands. Stems will often have one or two leaves, though they may lack them.

Most of a plant's leaves will be basal, growing directly from the base of the plant, with an overall length of 15 to 30 centimeters (6 to 12 in) and are unusually shorter than the stems. The petioles, the leaf stems, measure 6 to 21 cm (2.4 to 8.3 in). Each leaf will be divided into three parts and each part is subdivided into three leaflets. The upper surface of the leaflets will be hairless and green while the underside is glaucous, blue-gray due to natural waxes. Each leaflet measures 16 to 33 millimeters long by 16 to 37 mm wide and are cuneate-obovate, tear-drop in outline with a triangular base. Each of the nine leaflets in a leaf will have rounded corners and will be deeply divided into three sections.

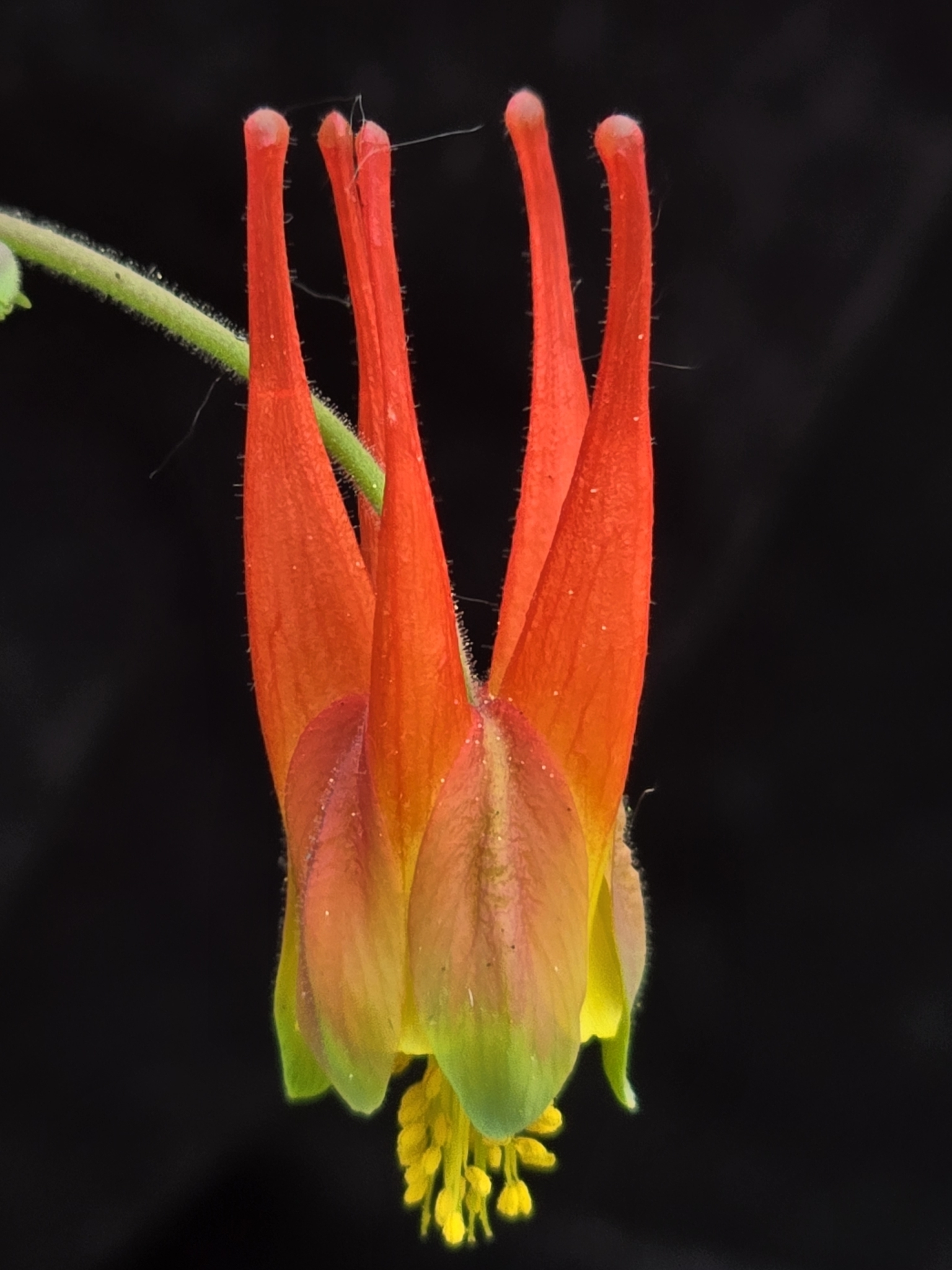
A flower with its five spurs

The flower has an overall length of 3 to 3.5 cm (1.2 to 1.4 in) including the elongated, knob-tipped spurs on each of the five petals. They reflect very little ultraviolet light and are scentless. The petals are bright red in the spurs and lighten to yellow-green or orange at the tips. Between the petals are the oval-shaped sepals, which are reddish to yellowish in color and are held parallel to the petals. Flowers often droop such that the mouth is toward the ground and the spurs point up.

Western red columbine is very similar in appearance to desert columbine (Aquilegia desertorum) and Canadian columbine (Aquilegia canadensis) and is found just to the north of the range of the desert adapted species in Utah and western Colorado. The flowers of the western red columbine are much narrower than those of Canadian columbine.

== Taxonomy ==
Aquilegia elegantula was scientifically described and named by the botanist Edward Lee Greene in 1899. It is classified in the genus Aquilegia as part of the Ranunculaceae family. The species is probably most closely related to Aquilegia coerulea and is part of a clade containing all the North American species of columbines that likely split from their closest relatives in East Asia in the mid-Pliocene, approximately 3.84 million years ago. Aquilegia elegantula has no varieties, but in 1893 Paul Johannes Brühl described a variety of Aquilegia canadensis named fendleri that is considered a botanical synonym.

=== Names ===
The specific epithet elegantula means "little elegant one". Aquilegia elegantula is known by the common names western red columbine, shooting star columbine, comet columbine, and elegant columbine. Additional names include red columbine, crimson columbine, and Rocky Mountain red columbine. It is also called Rocky Mountain columbine, however both Aquilegia coerulea and Aquilegia saximontana are also known by this name.

== Distribution and habitat ==
The species is native to the Four Corners states of Utah, Colorado, New Mexico, and Arizona, and Coahuila and Nuevo León in northern Mexico. There is found naturally at elevations of 1,500 to 3,500 meters (4,900 to 11,500 ft). It grows in moist Douglas fir and spruce–fir forests and in riparian areas near streams or other water courses. It is also found growing directly from rock faces and on subalpine slopes.

== Ecology ==
The flowers are pollinated by the broad-tailed hummingbird (Selasphorus platycercus). Aquilegia elegantula flowers produces more nectar, 3.9 microliters per day, than does Aquilegia micrantha, 2.45 microliters per day, and are likely a more attractive flower to hummingbirds when both are present in a habitat. Some bees will engage in nectar robbing by cutting holes in the narrow flower spurs.

== Conservation ==
As of October 2025, NatureServe listed Aquilegia elegantula as secure (G5). This status was last reviewed on 24 April 1991. NatureServe notes that the species is widespread and common across much of its range which is greater than 2,500,000 square kilometers (970,000 sq mi).

== Cultivation ==
Although desert columbine (Aquilegia desertorum) is more commonly planted in gardens, western red columbine is sometimes sold by plant nurseries for use by gardeners. It is planted in rock gardens and as a plant to attract hummingbirds to mountain gardens. When cultivated it requires partial shade unless it is watered generously.
