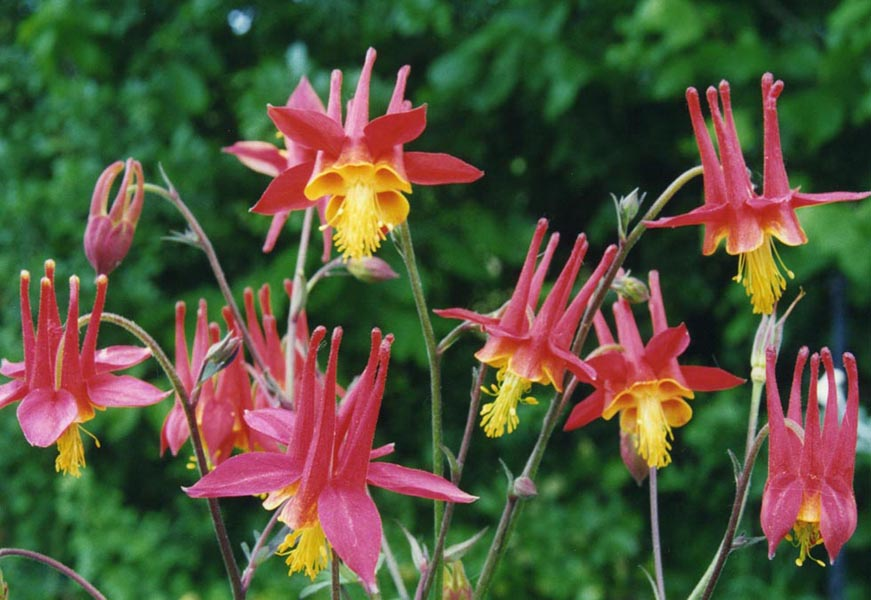
- Flowers of Aquilegia skinneri in bloom

Scientific classification
- Kingdom: Plantae
- Clade: Tracheophytes
- Clade: Angiosperms
- Clade: Eudicots
- Order: Ranunculales
- Family: Ranunculaceae
- Genus: Aquilegia
- Species: A. skinneri

Binomial name
- Aquilegia skinneri Hook.

Synonyms
- Aquilegia canadensis subsp. skinneri (Hook.) Brühl; Aquilegia madrensis Rose; Aquilegia mexicana Hook.; Aquilegia schinneri Poit.

= Aquilegia skinneri =

Species of flowering plant

Aquilegia skinneri, commonly known as the Mexican columbine or Skinner's columbine, is a perennial flowering plant in the family Ranunculaceae, native to Mexico and Guatemala.

== Description ==
Aquilegia skinneri grows to 60 to 100 cm (24 to 39 in) tall. The basal leaves are long-stalked and hairy on their undersides, and triternate (divided into three branches, each of which divides into three parts each having three leaflets). The flowers are nodding and measure 5.5 to 7.5 cm (2.2 to 3.0 in) long by 3.5 to 4 cm (1.4 to 1.6 in) across, with spreading, greenish-yellow, sepals 18 to 24 mm (0.71 to 0.94 in) long. The petals have straight red nectar spurs measuring 3.5 to 5 cm (1.4 to 2.0 in).

== Taxonomy ==
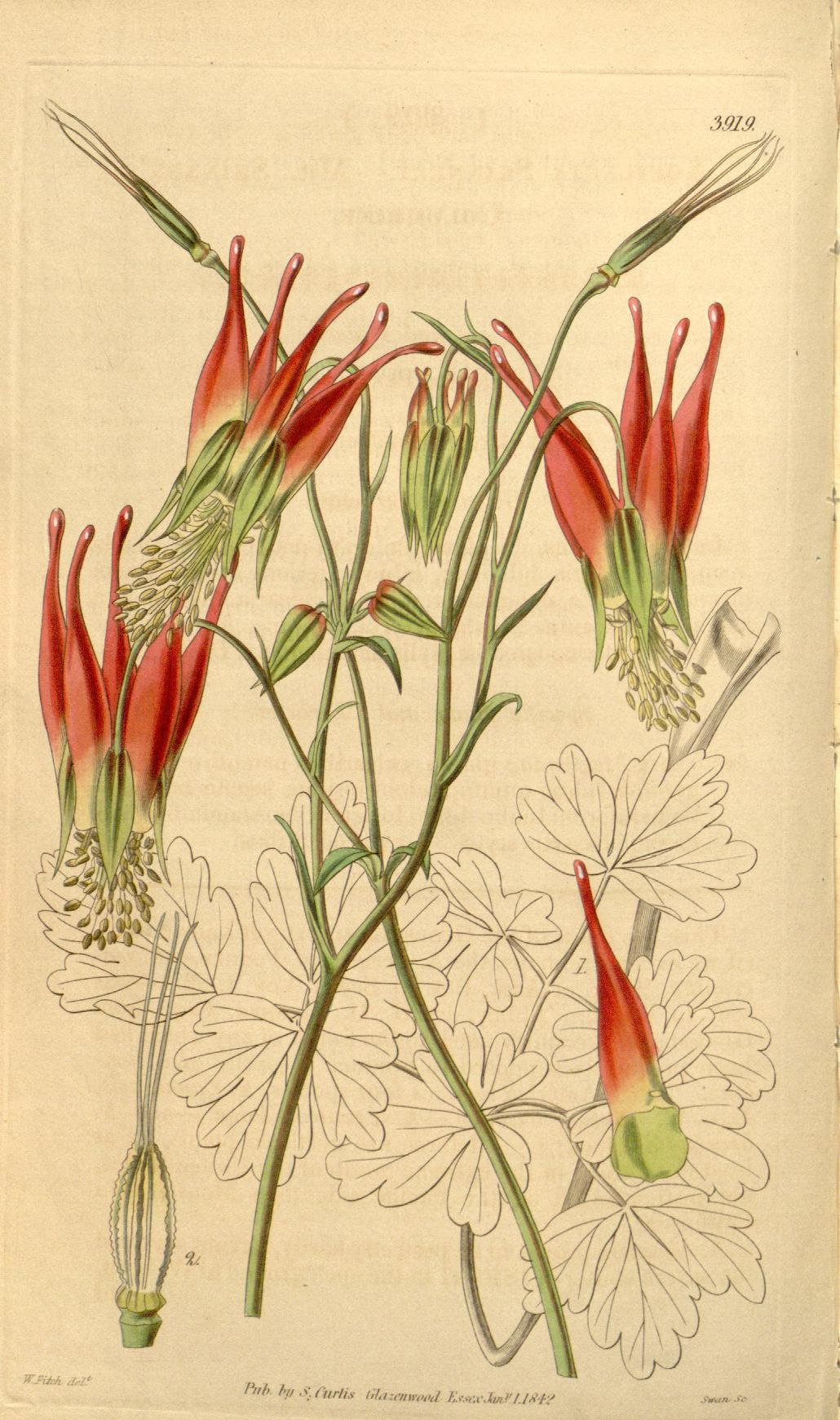
Botanical drawing of A. skinneri published with Hooker's description in Curtis's Botanical Magazine in 1842

Aquilegia skinneri was first described in 1842 by William Jackson Hooker in Curtis's Botanical Magazine, based on plants grown from seeds reported to have been collected in Guatemala by George Ure Skinner (1804–1867). The same year Hooker described another species, Aquilega mexicana, although this is now considered to be the same species as Aquilegia skinneri.

In 1909, Joseph Nelson Rose described a new species, Aquilegia madrensis, based on samples collected in the Sierra Madre in Mexico, which were described as having similar morphology to Aquilegia skinneri. Aquilegia madrensis is now also considered the same species as Aqulegia skinneri. Rose in part considered the samples he collected to belong to a different species because Hooker had reported that Aquilegia skinneri was a Guatemalan species. However, it suggested that the labels were mixed up in England, and that Skinner's samples were actually collected in Chihuahua in northern Mexico rather than Guatemala.

=== Etymology ===
Both the specific epithet "skinneri" and the common name "Skinner's columbine" are named after Skinner.

== Distribution and habitat ==
Aquilegia skinneri is native to Mexico and Guatemala. In Mexico it is present in the states of Chiapas, Chihuahua, Colima, Durango, Guerrero, Hidalgo, Jalisco, Mexico, Oaxaca, Sinaloa, Sonora, Veracruz, and Zacatecas.

== Ecology ==
Aquilegia skinneri flowers in summer.

== Conservation ==
As of November 2024, the species has not been assessed for the IUCN Red List.

== Uses ==
Aquilegia skinneri is cultivated as a garden ornamental.
