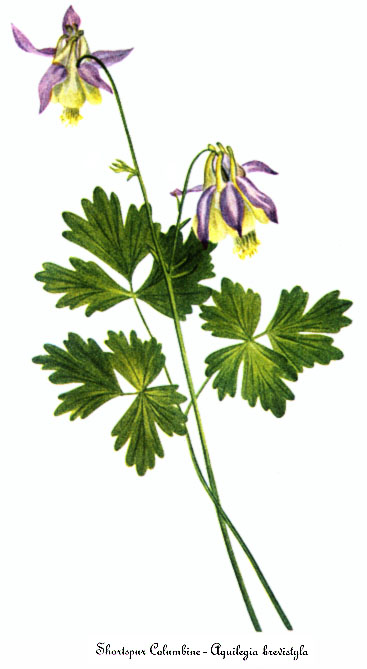

Conservation status
- Secure (NatureServe)

Scientific classification
- Kingdom: Plantae
- Clade: Tracheophytes
- Clade: Angiosperms
- Clade: Eudicots
- Order: Ranunculales
- Family: Ranunculaceae
- Genus: Aquilegia
- Species: A. brevistyla

Binomial name
- Aquilegia brevistyla Hook.

= Aquilegia brevistyla =

Species of flowering plant

Aquilegia brevistyla is a species of flowering plant in the buttercup family known by the common name smallflower columbine. It is native to northern North America, where it has a disjunct distribution. Most of its range extends from Alaska through much of Canada, and it also occurs in a few areas in the contiguous United States, such as the Black Hills of South Dakota and central Montana. It is most common in eastern Alaska, Yukon, the southern Northwest Territories, and northern parts of Alberta, Manitoba, and Saskatchewan.

This species is a rhizomatous perennial herb with stems up to 80 centimeters (31 in) tall. The leaves are compound, divided into wavy-edged leaflets. Basal leaves are borne on long petioles. Leaves higher on the stem have much shorter petioles. The nodding flowers are small for a columbine species. The sepals are up to 2.5 centimeters (0.98 in) long, reflexed, and blue to lavender in color. The spurs are up to a centimeter long. The petals are white or light yellow and up to a centimeter long. The fruits are follicles up to 2.5 centimeters long. Flowering occurs in May through July or August.

This plant is often found in moist habitat types, but it can occur in drier areas. It is often associated with limestone and other types of calcareous substrate. It may also occur on granite soils. It grows in coniferous forests, woods, meadows, and riverbanks. In the northern part of its range it usually grows in coniferous forest habitat. In the Black Hills area it can be found alongside Picea glauca, Pinus ponderosa, and Populus tremuloides. It usually grows in the understory, but occasionally it may be found in more open habitat. The plant is often associated with various mosses, such as feather moss, Hylocomium splendens. It may grow in moss carpets.

This plant is threatened by habitat loss in parts of its range, even in remote areas. Some occurrences in the southern parts of its range are threatened by recreational activities, such as off-road vehicle use. Grazing is a threat in some areas.
