= Bill Casselman (writer) =

Canadian writer & broadcaster (born 1942)

William Gordon Casselman (born 1942) is a Canadian writer and broadcaster. He has written about Canadian words, maintains a website about English etymology and a blog, The Casselmanual.

== Bibliography ==
- Casselman's Canadian Words: A Comic Browse through Words & Folk Sayings Invented by Canadians
  - 1st edition 1995 Copp Clark ISBN 0-7730-5515-0
  - 2nd edition 1997 Little, Brown ISBN 0-316-13350-7
  - 3rd edition 1999 McArthur & Company, ISBN 1-55278-034-1
- Casselmania: More Wacky Canadian Words & Sayings 1996 Little, Brown, ISBN 0-316-13314-0
- Canadian Garden Words, 1997, McArthur & Company, ISBN 0-316-13343-4
- A Dictionary of Medical Derivations: The Real Meanings of Medical Words, 1998, Parthenon Publishing Group, ISBN 1-85070-771-5
- Canadian Food Words: The Juicy Lore & Tasty Origins of Foods That Founded a Nation 1998, 1999 McArthur & Company ISBN 1-55278-018-X
  - The book was a recipient of the 1999 Canadian Culinary Book Award
- What's in a Canadian Name? The Origins and Meanings of Canadian Surnames, 2000 McArthur & Company, ISBN 1-55278-141-0
- Canadian Sayings : 1200 Folk Sayings Used by Canadians, Collected and Annotated by Bill Casselman, 1999 McArthur & Company, Toronto, Canada ISBN 1-55278-076-7
- Canadian Sayings 2: 1000 Folk Sayings Used by Canadians, 2002 McArthur & Company,ISBN 1-55278-272-7
- Canadian Sayings 3: 1000 Folk Sayings Used by Canadians, 2004 McArthur & Company,ISBN 1-55278-425-8
- As The Canoe Tips: Comic Scenes from Canadian Life, 2005 McArthur & Company, ISBN 1-55278-493-2
- Canadian Words & Sayings, 2006 McArthur & Company, ISBN 1-55278-569-6
- Where a Dobdob Meets a Dikdik, 2010, Adams Media, ISBN 1-4405-0636-1 (also available in several e-book formats)
  - Excerpt: "I delight in the joy of odd bird names: <...> How about an authentic bird name such as the Sooty Boubou? Sooty Boubou. Sounds like something that must be cured by an injection of antibiotics, after being contracted during an unwise moment of carnality in a Nairobi outhouse."
- At The Wording Desk: Notes nimble and spry about the origin of words, 2016 Trafford Publishing, ISBN 978-1-4907-7214-1 (sc) and ISBN 978-1-4907-7215-8 (hc) (self-published)
- Word Stash: Why Words Mean What They Mean, 2017 Trafford Publishing, ISBN 978-1-4907-8492-2 (sc) and ISBN 978-1-4907-8494-6 (hc) (self-published)
- Diary of a Daft Canuck: a novel by Bill Casselman, 2022 First Choice Books, Victoria, BC ISBN 978-0-2285-0652-2 (self-published)
