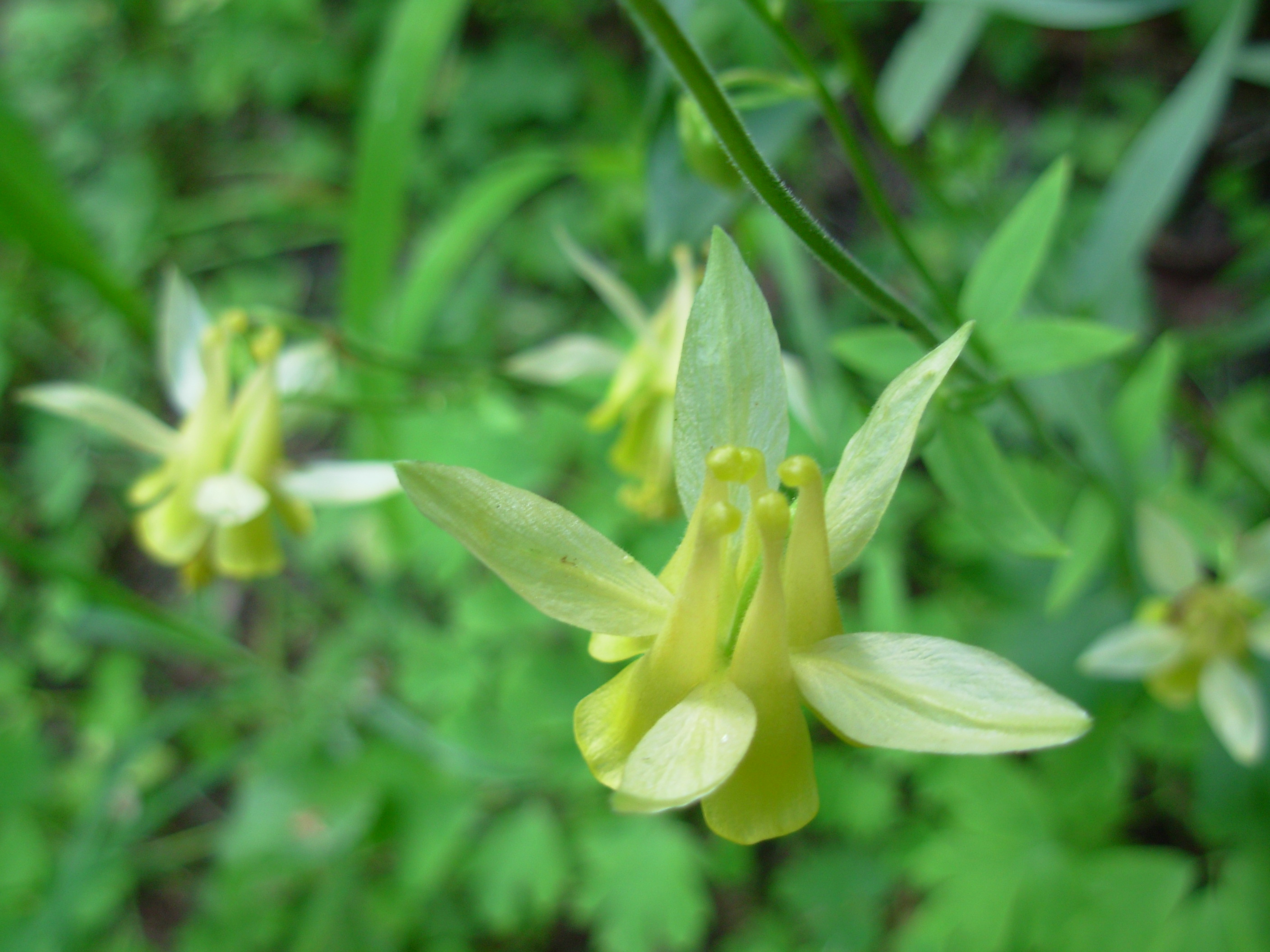

Conservation status
- Secure (NatureServe)

Scientific classification
- Kingdom: Plantae
- Clade: Tracheophytes
- Clade: Angiosperms
- Clade: Eudicots
- Order: Ranunculales
- Family: Ranunculaceae
- Genus: Aquilegia
- Species: A. flavescens

Binomial name
- Aquilegia flavescens S. Watson

Synonyms
- List: Aquilegia canadensis subsp. flavescens (S.Watson) Brühl; Aquilegia canadensis var. flavescens (S.Watson) K.C.Davis; Aquilegia coerulea var. flavescens (S.Watson) G.Lawson; Aquilegia formosa var. flavescens (S.Watson) Hook.f.; Aquilegia canadensis var. aurea Roezl; Aquilegia canadensis var. depauperata (M.E.Jones) K.C.Davis; Aquilegia depauperata M.E.Jones; Aquilegia flavescens f. minor Tidestr.

= Aquilegia flavescens =

North American species of columbine

Aquilegia flavescens, the yellow columbine, is a perennial species of flowering plant in the family Ranunculaceae, native to the Rocky Mountains of the United States and Canada.

== Description ==
Aquilegia flavescens grows to 20–70 cm (8–28 in) in height. The leaves are smooth or downy, and the stems are glandular pubescent. The flowers are nodding and the sepals usually yellow, but sometimes yellowish-pink or raspberry pink, reflexed, and 12–20 mm (0.5–0.8 in) in length. The petals are white or cream and 7–10 mm long, with the stamens extending beyond them. The nectar spurs are yellow to raspberry pink, slightly curved, and measure 10–20 mm (0.4–0.8 in).

== Taxonomy ==
The species is part of a clade containing all the North American species of columbines, that likely split from their closest relatives in East Asia in the mid-Pliocene, approximately 3.84 million years ago.

=== Etymology ===
The specific epithet flavescens means "pale yellow, turning yellow" in Latin.

== Distribution and habitat ==
The species is native to mountain meadows, open woods, and alpine slopes of the Rocky Mountains of eastern Utah, Idaho, eastern Washington, northeastern Oregon, western Montana, northeastern Wyoming, and southern British Columbia and Alberta. It grows at altitudes of 1,300–3,500 m (4,300–11,500 ft).

== Ecology ==
Aquilegia flavescens is pollinated by hummingbirds and visited by bumblebees including the common carder bee and the golden-belted bumblebee. It flowers from June to August and sometimes forms hybrid swarms with Aquilegia formosa var. formosa, which grows at lower elevations throughout much of its range.

== Conservation ==
As of November 2024, NatureServe listed Aquilegia flavescens as Secure (G5) worldwide. This status was last reviewed on 13 May 2016. In individual provinces and states, it is listed as Secure (G5) in British Columbia; Apparently Secure (S4) in Alberta, Montana, and Wyoming; and has no status rank in Washington, Oregon, Idaho, Utah, or Colorado.
