= Paul Johannes Brühl =

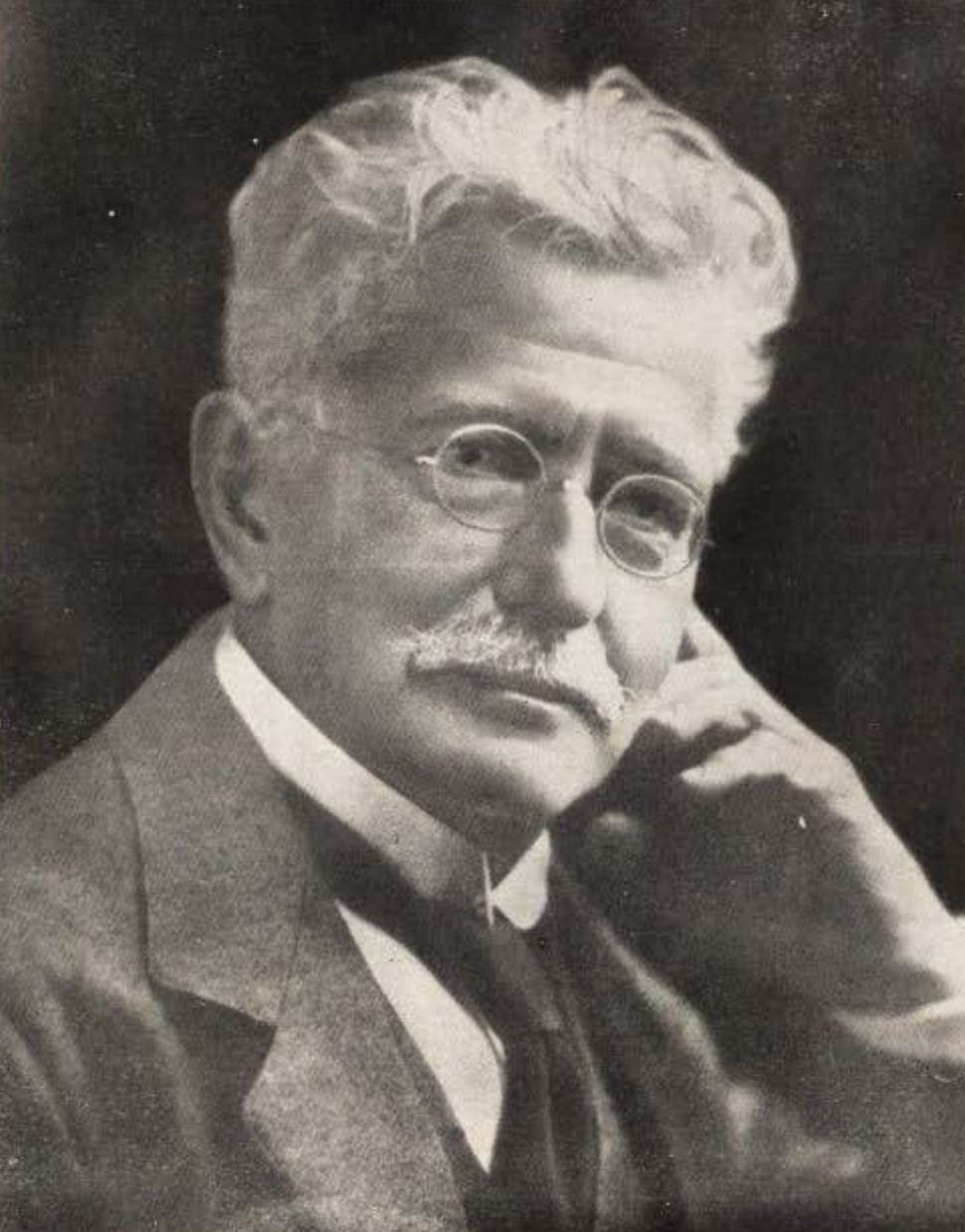

Paul Johannes Brühl (25 February 1855 – 7 September 1935) was a German-origin professor of botany who worked in India, mainly at the Presidency College, Calcutta.

Brühl was born in Weifa, Bautzen, Saxony to Michael Brühl and was educated in Germany and received a scholarship to travel and collect botanical specimens through Europe. He then walked across Europe into Asia Minor. He taught briefly in Constantinople and reached India in 1881 and taught science at the Rajshahi College in 1882. He married Annie Betts Fox in 1883 and through the influence of Sir George King, he joined the Bengal Engineering College in 1887 where he taught chemistry, geology, and agriculture. In 1896 he published The Century of new and rare Indian plants along with King. He was popular and known for his sympathetic handling of students. In 1902-3 he taught geology at Presidency College as a part-time lecturer. He retired from the engineering college in 1912 and was made Companion of the Imperial Service Order. He worked briefly at the Indian Institute of Science in Bangalore in 1912-13 studying geological chemistry. In 1913 he was invited by Sir Ashutosh Mukherjee to serve as registrar for Calcutta University which he found very unpleasant. He planned to leave to England in 1914 but the war prevented him from going. He later served as a professor of botany from 1918 and served in the position until 1928. He worked on control of the water hyacinth and examined cryptogams, mosses, orchids, invasive plants, and published along with Sir George King and other botanists. His library of German physics books including those by Maxwell, Boltzmann and Planck were made available to D. M. Bose and Meghnad Saha in Calcutta.
