= Rocky Creek =

Rocky Creek may refer to:

== Australia ==
- Rocky Creek Dam, a water catchment dam on the North Coast of New South Wales, Australia
- Rocky Creek, Queensland, a locality in the Toowoomba Region

== United States ==
- Rocky Creek, Florida, an unincorporated community in Hillsborough County
- Rocky Creek (Oregon), a coastal stream in Lincoln County
- Rocky Creek (Current River), a stream in Missouri
- Rocky Creek (South Carolina), a tributary of the Broad River (Carolinas)
- Rocky Creek (Texas), a stream in Victoria County
- Rocky Creek (Wisconsin), a stream in Wisconsin
- Rocky Creek Bridge (California), a bridge in Monterey County
- Rocky Creek Bridge No. 01089, a highway bridge along the Oregon coast

== See also ==
- Rock Creek (disambiguation)
