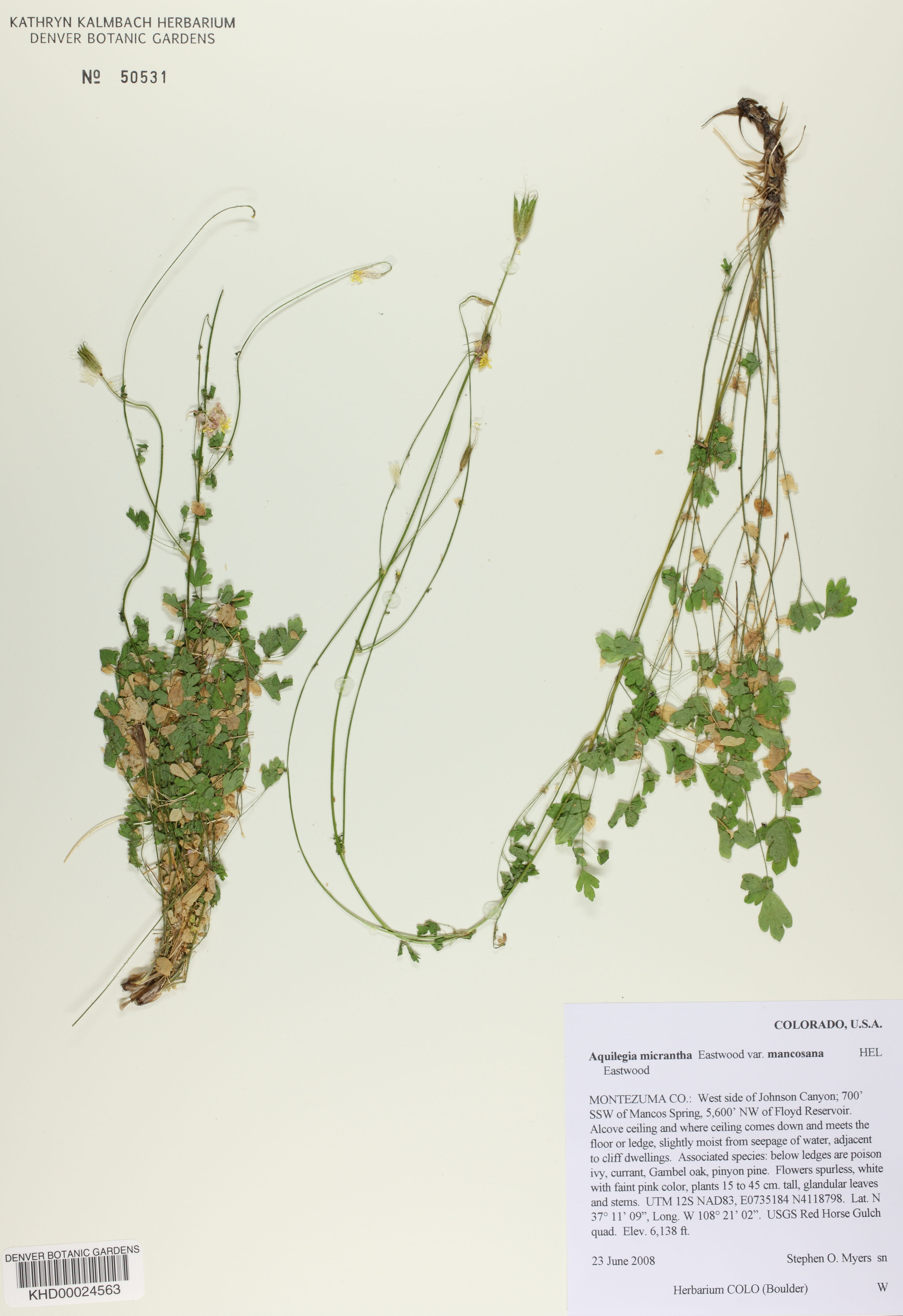
- Flowering specimen of Aquilegia micrantha var. mancosana

Scientific classification
- Kingdom: Plantae
- Clade: Embryophytes
- Clade: Tracheophytes
- Clade: Angiosperms
- Clade: Eudicots
- Order: Ranunculales
- Family: Ranunculaceae
- Genus: Aquilegia
- Species: A. micrantha
- Variety: A. m. var. mancosana

Trinomial name
- Aquilegia micrantha var. mancosana Eastw. 1897
- Location of the cave where A. micrantha var. mancosana is found in Colorado

Synonyms
- List: Aquilegia ecalarata East. 1891; Aquilegia mancosana Cockerell 1902; Aquilegia eastwoodiae Rydb. 1902; Semiaquilegia eastwoodiae J.R.Drumm. & Hutch. 1920

= Aquilegia micrantha var. mancosana =

Variety of flowering plant

Aquilegia micrantha var. mancosana is a perennial flowering plant which is a variety of the Aquilegia (columbine) species Aquilegia micrantha in the family Ranunculaceae. The variety's first recorded observance was in 1891. It was first described by the American botanist Alice Eastwood as native to a single cavern of the Johnson Canyon in Ute Mountain Tribal Park, Colorado, United States. Described as lacking nectar spurs – something unusual among members of the Aquilegia genus – the plant was observed in the same location the next year. From then until the early 21st century, it had not been observed again in the wild and was presumed extinct. Despite this, it was still listed in Colorado floras. It has since been observed again at its original location.

The taxonomic history of A. micrantha var. mancosana is unusual. It was initially described by Eastwood with the name A. ecalarata. It was described as A. eastwoodiae and A. mancosana in 1902. In 1920, it was briefly reassigned as part of the genus Semiaquilegia under the name S. eastwoodiae. Eastwood had renamed the Johnson Canyon columbine to A. micranatha mancosana in 1897, describing it as a variety of A. micrantha.

== Description ==
Aquilegia micrantha var. mancosana is variety of Aquilegia micrantha, a species of perennial herb in the genus Aquilegia (columbines) in the family Ranunculaceae. It possesses long woody roots beneath a tuft base covered by brown sheaths of dead leaves. Numerous stems, ranging in height from 30 cm (12 in) to 50 cm (20 in), sprout upwards with leaves extending from the lower portion on long narrow petioles on and on broader petioles further up the stem. The Swedish-American botanist Per Axel Rydberg described the leaves of this columbine, with their rhombic outlines and acuteness, as unique among North American Aquilegia.

The flowers of A. m. var. mancosana are broad and measure 2 cm (0.79 in) across. They are pink or white and possess what their first describer, the American botanist Alice Eastwood, called a "delicate texture, with a sweet strong perfume". On Aquilegia, flowers typically have five sepals and five petals. The sepals of A. m. var. mancosana have an ovate-lanceolate shape. The broad petals were 12 mm (0.47 in) long and 2 mm (0.079 in) wide, terminating near where the spur structure was found.

In Aquilegia, the flowers typically feature nectar spurs. Exceptions exist, with flowers that are spurless or have abortive spurs. A. m. var. mancosana have flowers that feature small sac-like white outgrowths instead of conventional spurs. Spurless columbine flowers like those of A. m. var. mancosana resemble the flowers of Isopyrum, Clematis, and Anemone more than the flowers of other columbines.

All Aquilegia flowers are bisexual, thus featuring both male and female reproductive structures. The styles of A. m. var. mancosana are 5 mm (0.20 in) to 7 cm (2.8 in) long and the ovaries are viacid-pubescent in shape. In her 1897 description of A. m. var. mancosana, Eastwood said the plant's fruits and seeds approximate those of A. micrantha. Her description of A. micrantha as a new species accompanied this description of A. m. var. mancosana. Describing A. micrantha's fruit and seeds, Eastwood observed four to five follicles with lengths of 15 mm (0.59 in). She also noted that the seeds were glossy black.

== Observation ==
In June 1891, Alfred Wetherill collected a fragmentary specimen of a spurless columbine in a cavern within Johnson Canyon in southwestern Colorado. This specimen was submitted to Eastwood, who described it as a new species with the name Aquilegia ecalcarata. Eastwood visited the type locality in September 1892, collecting more specimens that were then fruiting, as well as roots and seeds. While the latter of these collections were distributed to gardens around the United States, only those sent to a gardener in Denver survived. These cultivated plants bloomed in the two years preceding 1895.

Up to 2003, Eastwood's 1892 observation of A. micrantha var. mancosana was the last time that the plant was observed in the wild. By this point, the species was presumed extinct in the wild. However, it continued to be listed in floras of Colorado, including that of Harold Harrington (1964). Two specimens of the variety were collected by Stephen O. Myers on 23 June 2008 at the same type locality as those of the 1890s. These specimens are currently in the herbariums of the University of Northern Colorado and the Denver Botanic Gardens.

=== Distribution ===
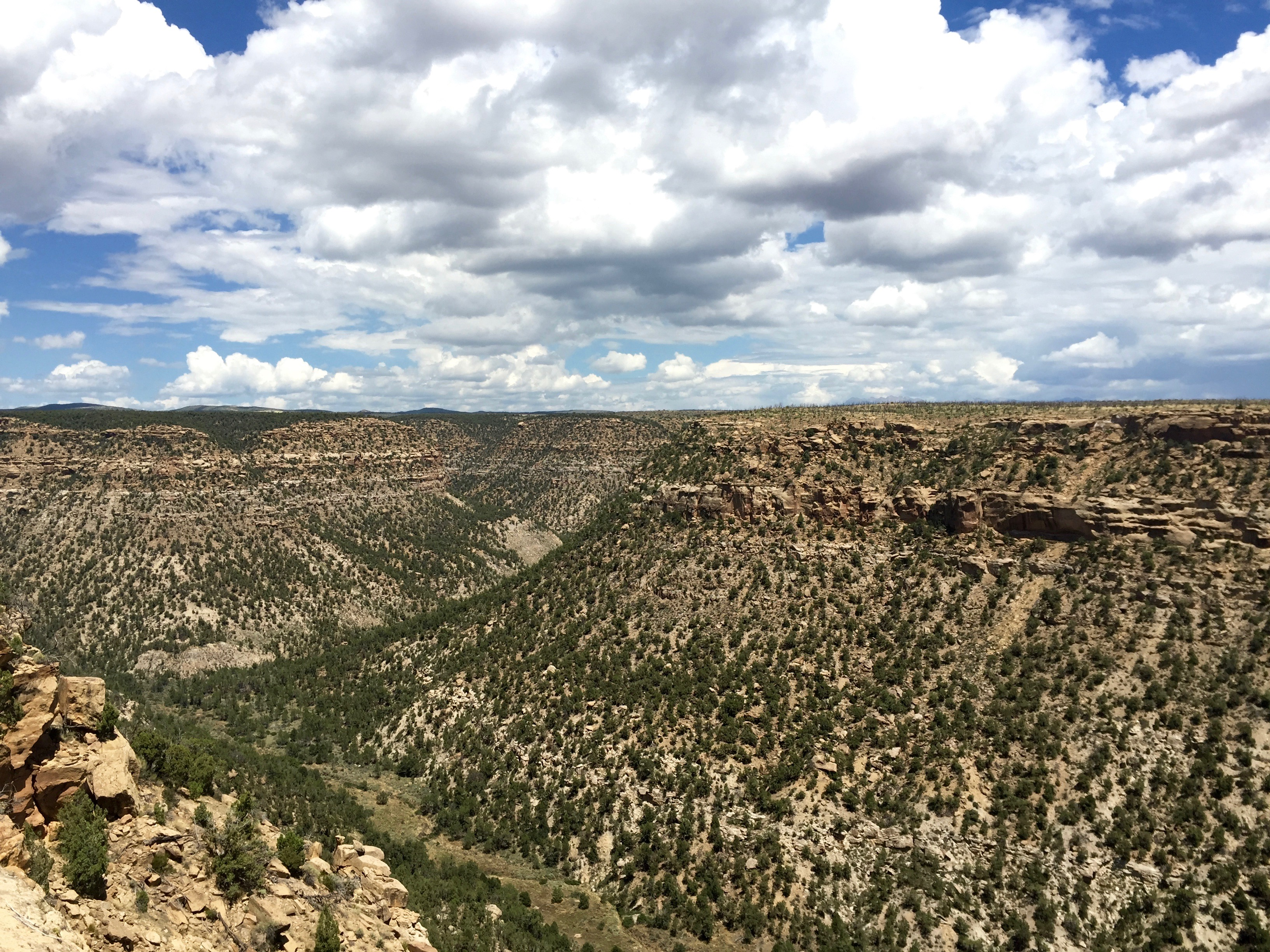
The Mancos River cuts several canyons (pictured) in southwestern Colorado, with the Johnson Canyon serving as the sole habitat of the plant

The sole location that Aquilegia micrantha var. mancosana is known to inhabit is what Eastwood described as a "niche-like cavern" at the head of the Johnson Canyon (which Eastwood called "Johnston Cañon"), formed by the Mancos River in the Ute Mountain Tribal Park, southwestern Colorado. While Eastwood described this cavern as sunless, the American botanist Robert Nold noted that this was hyperbolic as columbines require sunlight to survive. The plants observed by Eastwood relied on the limited moisture that reached the cave and noted that they clung close to and grew along the walls where moisture was more prevalent. The location for the 2008 collections was given as on the west side of Johnson Canyon at an elevation of 6,138 ft (1,871 m).

== Taxonomy ==
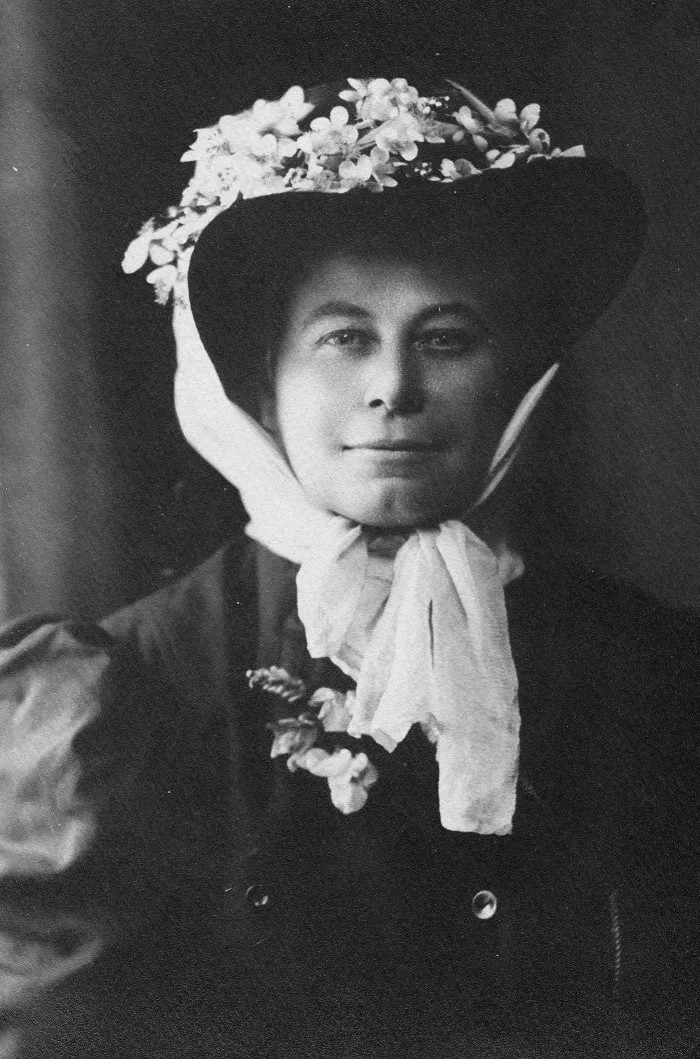
Alice Eastwood (pictured) was the first to describe Aquilegia micrantha var. mancosana.

Nold described Aquilegia micrantha var. mancosana as having a "peculiar" taxonomic history. The species was first described by the American botanist Alice Eastwood in the biological journal Zoe in 1891. Identifying it as a novel species with the name A. ecalcarata, Eastwood was unaware that the name had already been given to another species of columbine by the Russian botanist Karl Maximovich in 1889.

Marcus E. Jones, an American geologist and botanist, established a section of Aquilegia named Pseudaquilegia to contain the Johnson Canyon columbine in 1893. The characteristics of this section were spurless flowers and triternate leaves. In 1895, Eastwood utilized specimens she had collected to provide a new description of the columbine. She reported that she was aware of the name A. ecalcarata being a taxonomic synonym for Aquilegia vulgaris but stood by using A. ecalcarata for the Johnson Canyon columbine, saying she was "not in sympathy with the movement that is producing such chaos in nomenclature and do not care to become a name changer myself".

Simultaneously with her second description, Eastwood described Aquilegia micrantha, a spurred columbine native to the same area that she assessed as closely related to the Johnson Canyon columbine. She adjusted the definition of Pseudaquilegia to accommodate A. micrantha, describing it as "leaves triternate, spurs irregular or abortive, flowers small"; ultimately, the section Pseudaquilegia was not widely accepted. In her second description, Eastwood suggested that the Johnson Canyon columbine was likely closely related to A. micrantha, speculating that the latter was possibly a "degenerate descendant or less specialized progenitor or perhaps even a starved, cave-dwelling form".

Eastwood acknowledged Maximovich's primacy in naming a species A. ecalcarata in 1897. In doing so, she reassigned the Johnson Canyon columbine as a variety of A. micrantha and renamed the spurless form A. micrantha mancosana (render in modern taxonomic formatting as A. micrantha var. mancosana) in reference to the plant's native region.

In 1902, Rydberg described the Johnson Canyon columbine as Aquilegia eastwoodiae in his description of the plant for the Bulletin of the Torrey Botanical Club. This name would form the basis for the plant's abortive reassignment to the genus Semiaquilegia. In 1920, British botanists James Ramsay Drummond and John Hutchinson published a paper addressing problems that had developed within the genus Isopyrum. Part of the pair's proposed resolution was creating the genus Paraquilegia and expanding the genus Semiaquilegia. Among the three species they assigned to Semiaquilegia was the Johnson Canyon columbine, adapting Rydberg's name as Semiaquilegia eastwoodiae. Nold would characterize this expansion of Semiaquilegia as "rather less fortunate"; all three species Drummond and Hutchinson added are no longer considered Semiaquilegia.

In his 1918 manual on North American Aquilegia for Contributions from the United States National Herbarium, the American botanist Edwin Blake Payson readopted the name A. ecalcarata in describing the Johnson Canyon plant. He further described A. micrantha as a subspecies with the name A. ecalcarata micrantha. Louis Otho Williams and Philip A. Munz, who were both American botanists, rejected Payson's assessment in 1936 and 1946 respectively, as taxonomic nomenclature generally favors the greatest age in assessing primacy. Both accepted A. micrantha var. mancosana as the name for the Johnson Canyon columbine. As of 2025, Kew Botanic Gardens's Plants of the World Online considers that name a synonym for Aquilegia micrantha var. micrantha.

=== Etymology ===
The genus name Aquilegia may come from the Latin word for "eagle", aquila, in reference to the petals' resemblance to eagle talons. Aquilegia may also derive from aquam legere, which is Latin for "to collect water", or aquilegium, a Latin word for a container of water. The specific name micrantha means "small-flowered", from Greek μικρός "small" + ἄνθος "flower, blossom". The varietal name mancosana derives from the region of the plant's origin.
