= Aquilegia kansuensis =

Scientific classification
- Kingdom: Plantae
- Clade: Tracheophytes
- Clade: Angiosperms
- Clade: Eudicots
- Order: Ranunculales
- Family: Ranunculaceae
- Genus: Aquilegia
- Species: A. kansuensis

Binomial name
- Aquilegia kansuensis (Brühl) Erst

Synonyms
- Aquilegia oxysepala var. kansuensis (Brühl) Brühl ex Hand.-Mazz.; Aquilegia vulgaris var. kansuensis Brühl

Species of flowering plant

Aquilegia kansuensis is a perennial flowering plant in the family Ranunculaceae, native to northern and central China and North Korea.

== Description ==
Aquilegia kansuensis is a perennial herbaceous plant growing to 40–70 cm (16–28 in) tall, rarely as little as 20 cm (8 in). The rhizome is roughly cylindrical and descends vertically. The stems are 3–15 mm thick at the base, erect, smooth or downy, and slightly furrowed, with the remains of previous years' leaves around the base. The leaves are biternate and have long, slender stalks with a smooth or downy surface. The leaflets are green above and pale green below and wedge- or egg-shaped, with short stalks of around 1 cm (0.4 in) length.

The plant produces 2–10 nodding flowers (very rarely a single flower) on slender, densely downy stalks. The sepals are brownish-purple, a pointed lancehead shape, and 17–30 mm (0.7–1.2 in) long. The petal blades are oblong with a rounded end and whitish or cream in colour, with hooked, incurved nectar spurs which are slightly shorter than the petals at approximately 15 mm (0.6 in) and conical at the base. The petals curve inwards and almost merge at the edges. The stamens are shorter than the petals and brightly coloured. The anthers are 1–2 mm long and oblong, coloured yellow to dark green.

== Taxonomy ==
The plant was initially described as a variety kansuensis of Aquilegia oxysepala by the German botanist Paul Johannes Brühl in 1892. In 2014, the Russian botanist Andrey Erst and colleagues raised it to the status of a distinct species, noting that differences in morphological characteristics and molecular phylogenetic data both supported this conclusion.

The molecular phylogenetic data largely came from the work of the Italian plant geneticist Simone Fior and colleagues, who found in 2013 that A. oxysepala as then defined was polyphyletic, and A. oxysepala var. kansuensis (as A. kansuensis was then classified) was most closely related to Aquilegia ecalcarata in the Aquilegia rockii group, unlike the other varieties of A. oxysepala. The A. rockii group is thought to have diverged from other Eurasian species around 3.88 million years ago, in the mid-Pliocene.

=== Etymology ===
The specific epithet kansuensis means "from Kansu (Gansu) province, China", referring to part of the native range of the plant.

== Distribution and habitat ==
Aquilegia kansuensis is native to China, in the provinces of Gansu, Guizhou, southern Ningxia, eastern Qinghai, southern Shaanxi, Sichuan, and northern Yunnan, and also to North Korea. It grows in forests, forest margins, and riverside environments, and its range overlaps with that of Aquilegia ecalcarata in some areas.

== Conservation ==
As of January 2025, the species has not been assessed for the IUCN Red List. As of February 2025, Plants of the World Online, utilizing the Angiosperm Extinction Risk Predictions v1, predicted the extinction risk for Aquilegia kansuensis as "not threatened" with a confidence level of "confident".

== Ecology ==
Aquilegia kansuensis flowers for around a month between early June and late July, with each flower lasting around eight days. It is primarily pollinated by the hoverfly Rhingia campestris, and occasionally also visited by hoverflies of the genus Pipiza.
