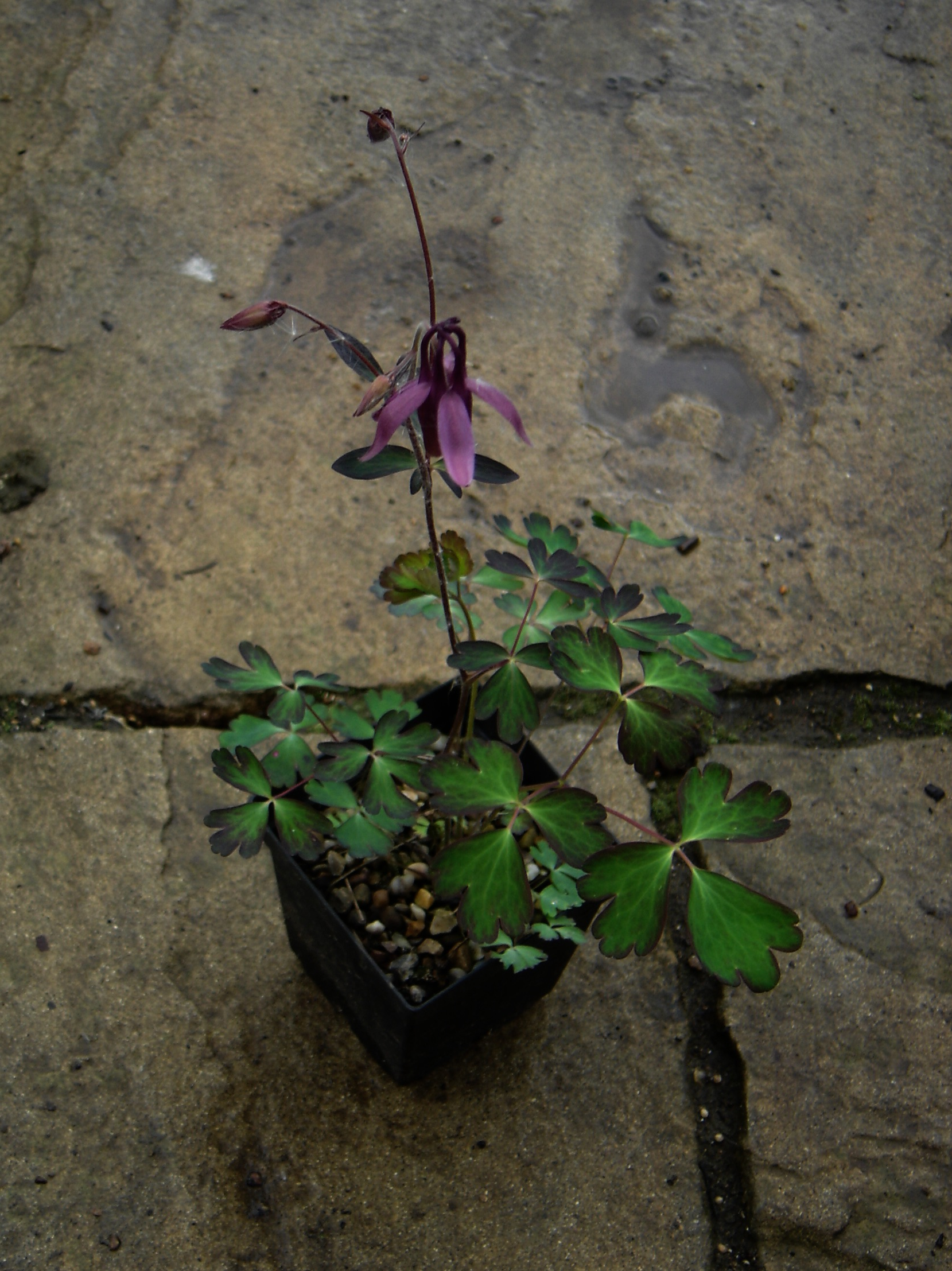
- Potted Aquilegia rockii plant grown in Small Dole, England

Scientific classification
- Kingdom: Plantae
- Clade: Embryophytes
- Clade: Tracheophytes
- Clade: Angiosperms
- Clade: Eudicots
- Order: Ranunculales
- Family: Ranunculaceae
- Genus: Aquilegia
- Species: A. rockii

Binomial name
- Aquilegia rockii Munz

= Aquilegia rockii =

Asian species of columbine

Aquilegia rockii is a perennial flowering plant in the family Ranunculaceae, native to southern China.

== Description ==
Aquilegia rockii grows to between 40 and 80 cm (16 and 31 in) tall, with branching, pubescent stems and biternate basal leaves. The plant produces nodding blue or purple flowers 3.5 to 4 cm (1.4 to 1.6 in) in diameter, with sepals of 2–3 cm (0.79–1.18 in) length and petals measuring 1–1.5 cm (0.39–0.59 in). The nectar spurs are straight or slightly incurved and vary strikingly in length, from 1 mm to 20 mm. The stamens are shorter than the petals.

The chloroplast genome of Aquilegia rockii has been fully sequenced. It has a total length of 162,123 base pairs, and contains 117 unique genes.

== Taxonomy ==
Phylogenies based on chloroplast genome sequences place Aquilegia rockii in a clade with Aquilegia viridiflora and Aquilegia ecalcarata. Other analyses place A. rockii in a monophyletic clade again with A. ecalcarata but also including A. yabeana and A. kansuensis and omitting A. viridiflora, this clade diverging from its closest relatives in the mid-Pliocene around 3.88 million years ago.

=== Etymology ===
The specific epithet rockii honours the Austrian-American botanist Joseph Rock (1884–1962), who collected the type specimen from which the species was described.

== Distribution and habitat ==
The species is native to southwestern Sichuan, northeastern Yunnan, and southeastern Tibet, where it grows in mixed forests at altitudes of 2,500–3,500 m (8,200–11,500 ft).

== Ecology ==
Aquilegia rockii flowers from June to August. It is primarily pollinated by bumblebees.

== Conservation ==
The species has not been assessed for the IUCN Red List.
