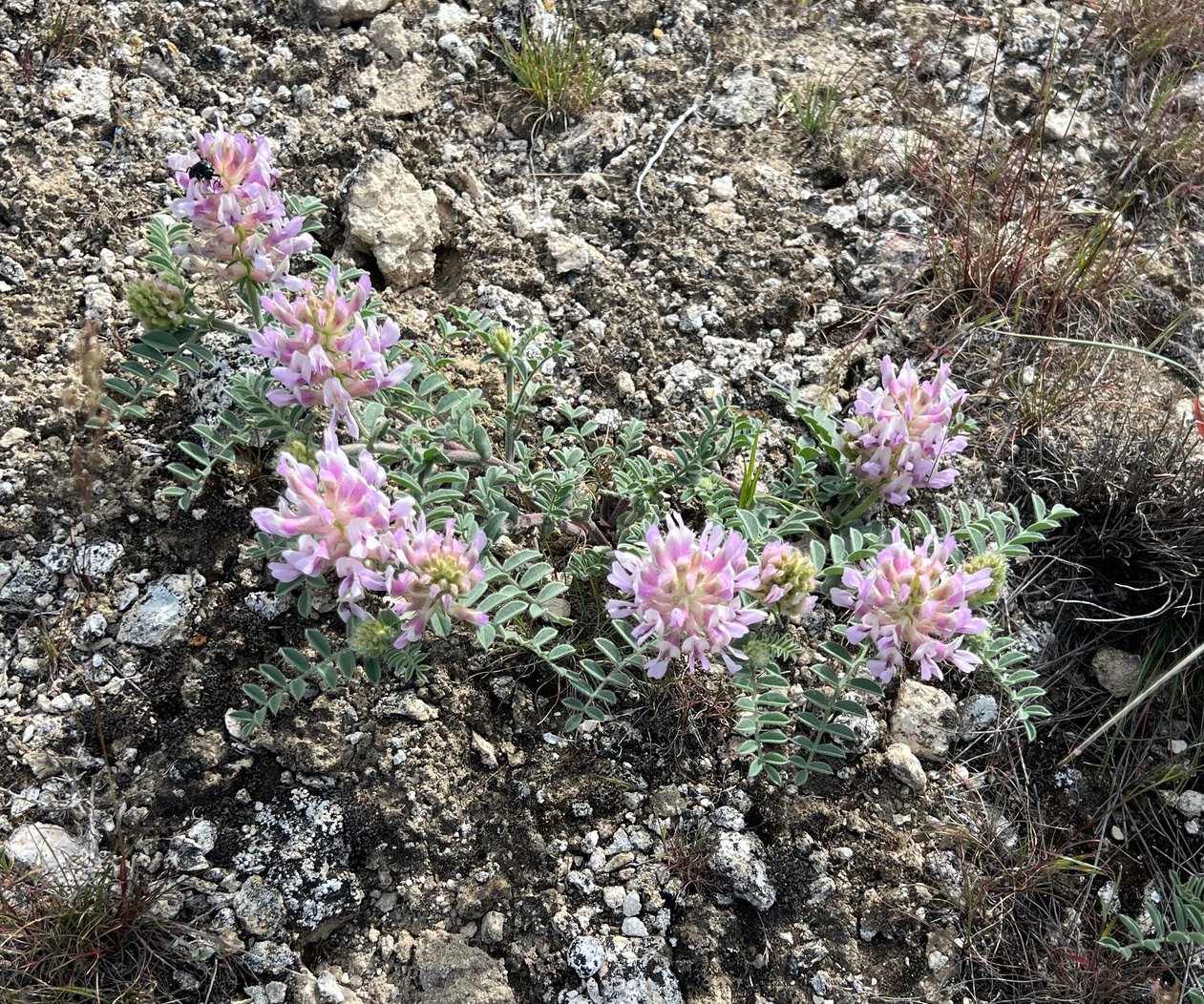

Conservation status
- Apparently Secure (NatureServe)

Scientific classification
- Kingdom: Plantae
- Clade: Tracheophytes
- Clade: Angiosperms
- Clade: Eudicots
- Clade: Rosids
- Order: Fabales
- Family: Fabaceae
- Subfamily: Faboideae
- Genus: Astragalus
- Species: A. succumbens

Binomial name
- Astragalus succumbens Douglas ex Hook.

Synonyms
- Astragalus dorycnioides Douglas ex G.Don; Hamosa succumbens (Douglas ex Hook.) Rydb.; Phaca succumbens (Douglas ex Hook.) Piper; Tragacantha succumbens (Douglas ex Hook.) Kuntze

= Astragalus succumbens =

Species of flowering plant

Astragalus succumbens is a perennial species of flowering plant in the legume family, commonly referred to as Columbia milkvetch. Other names include the crouching milkvetch and sprawling milkvetch. It is native to north-central Oregon and south-central Washington in the Columbia River valley.

== Description ==
Astragalus succumbens is a small- to medium-sized sprawling plant with compound leaves, bearing erect racemes of flowers that are usually light pink. It grows from a long taproot and forms multiple stems with alternate compound leaves, each up to about 10 cm (3.9 in) long and with multiple paired leaflets and one terminal leaflet. Each leaflet is obovate to elliptic, usually with an acute tip, 5 to 19 mm (0.20 to 0.75 in) long, and densely hairy on top. The flowers are born on a dense upright raceme growing from a leaf axil and are usually light pink with a darker center, but sometimes light purple or nearly white. The flower form is typical of the legume family, with banner, wing, and keel petals. The flower calyx has stout hairs and long pointed tooth-like lobes. The curved hairless seed pods are held erect to angled upward and are up to 40 mm (1.6 in) long and 7 mm (0.28 in) wide. The pods are first shiny green, turning reddish brown with age.

== Range and habitat ==
Astragalus succumbens is found in the Columbia River valley in northern Oregon and south-central Washington. It usually grows in sandy soils among sagebrush and in somewhat barren areas.

== Gallery ==
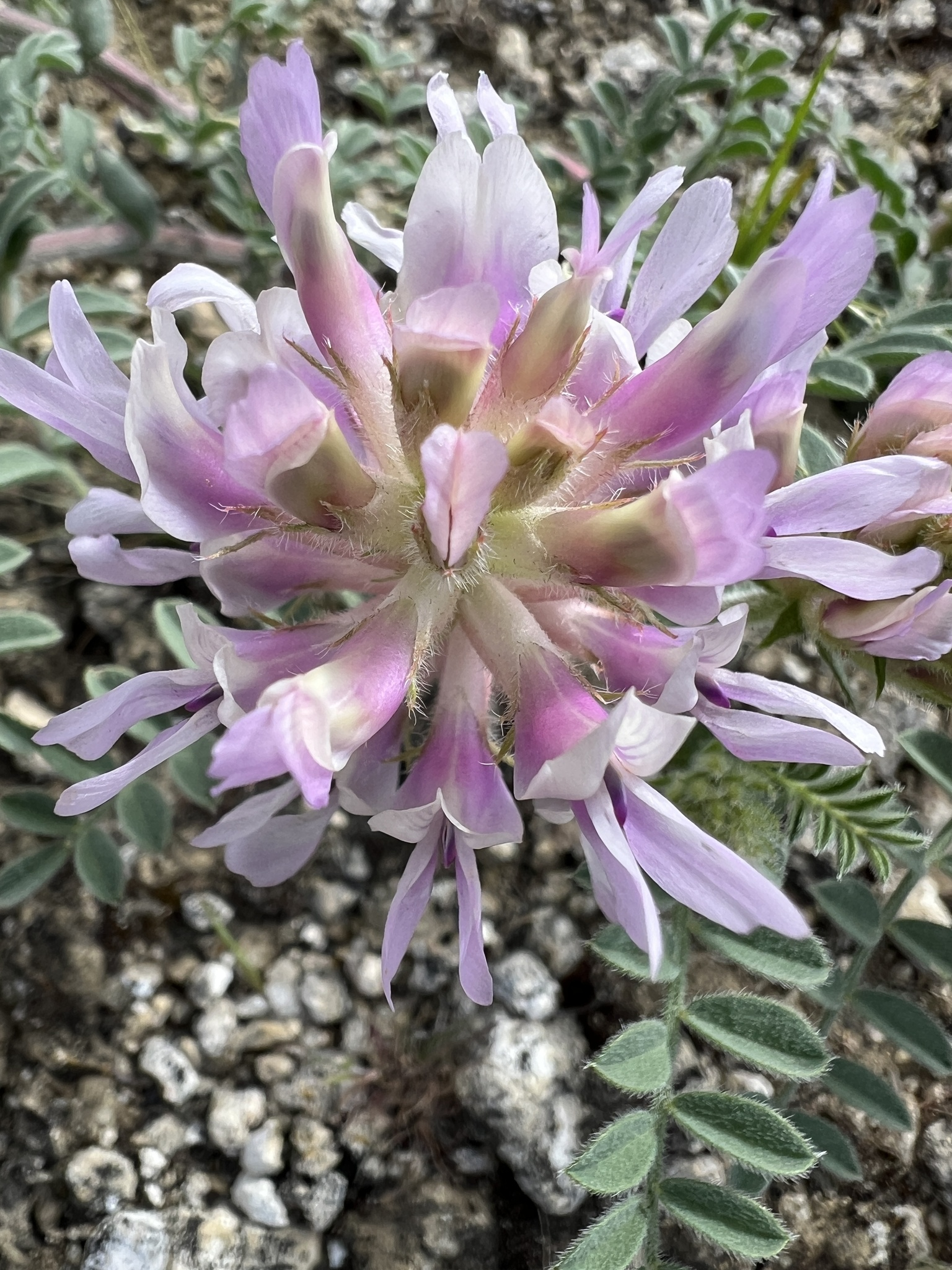
Flower

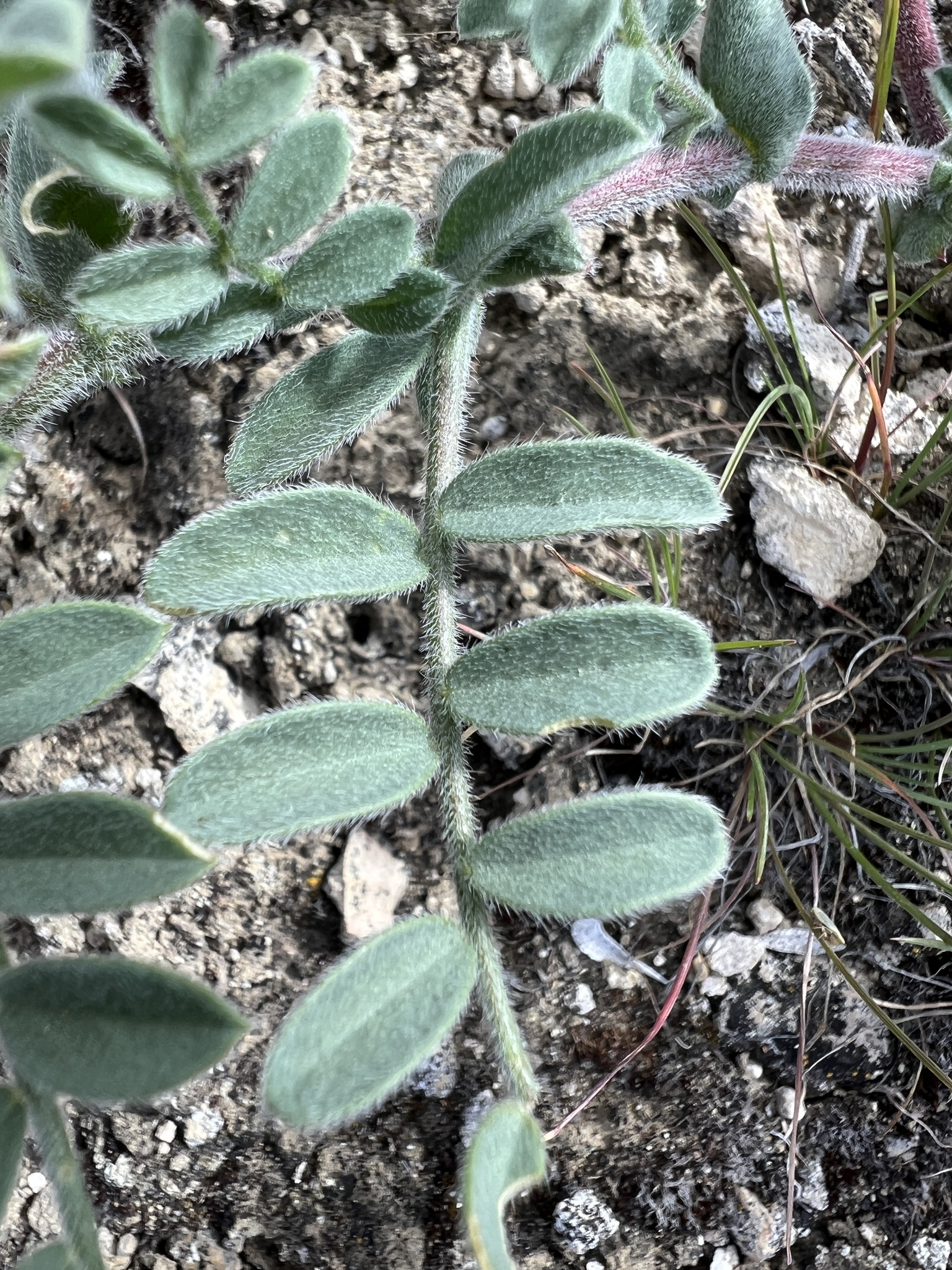
Leaf
