= Erigeron kachinensis =

Conservation status
- Vulnerable (NatureServe)

Scientific classification
- Kingdom: Plantae
- Clade: Embryophytes
- Clade: Tracheophytes
- Clade: Angiosperms
- Clade: Eudicots
- Clade: Asterids
- Order: Asterales
- Family: Asteraceae
- Genus: Erigeron
- Species: E. kachinensis

Binomial name
- Erigeron kachinensis S.L.Welsh & Gl.Moore

Species of flowering plant

Erigeron kachinensis is a species of flowering plant in the family Asteraceae known by the common names Kachina fleabane and Kachina daisy. It is native to Utah and Colorado in the United States. It is an endemic of the Colorado Plateau.

Erigeron kachinensis grows from a taproot and branching caudex and has stems up to 18 centimeters (7.2 inches) in length. The leaves at the base of the plant are up to 5 centimeters (2 niches) long, with smaller ones along the stem. They are hairless and non-glandular. The flower heads have phyllaries which are often purplish and are hairless. They contain white or pinkish ray florets surrounding small yellow disc florets. It often flowers twice a year.

Erigeron kachinensis was discovered and described in 1968 in Utah, near Kachina Natural Bridge in Natural Bridges National Monument. It was discovered in the Dolores River Canyon in Colorado in 1977. It grows in hanging gardens and seeps in the cracks of rock faces. The rock is Cedar Mesa Sandstone. The plant relies on seeps of water coming from the rock cracks. If the water dries up, as in a drought, the plants die. Associated plants in the habitat include Aquilegia micrantha (Mancos columbine), Calamagrostis scopulorum, Zigadenus vaginatus (death camas), and Cirsium calcareum (Cainville thistle).

The alcoves in which the plant grows sometimes contain Anasazi ruins. Tourists examining the ruins may affect the plants. The word kachina refers to a spirit being in the traditions of some of the Native American groups in the region.
