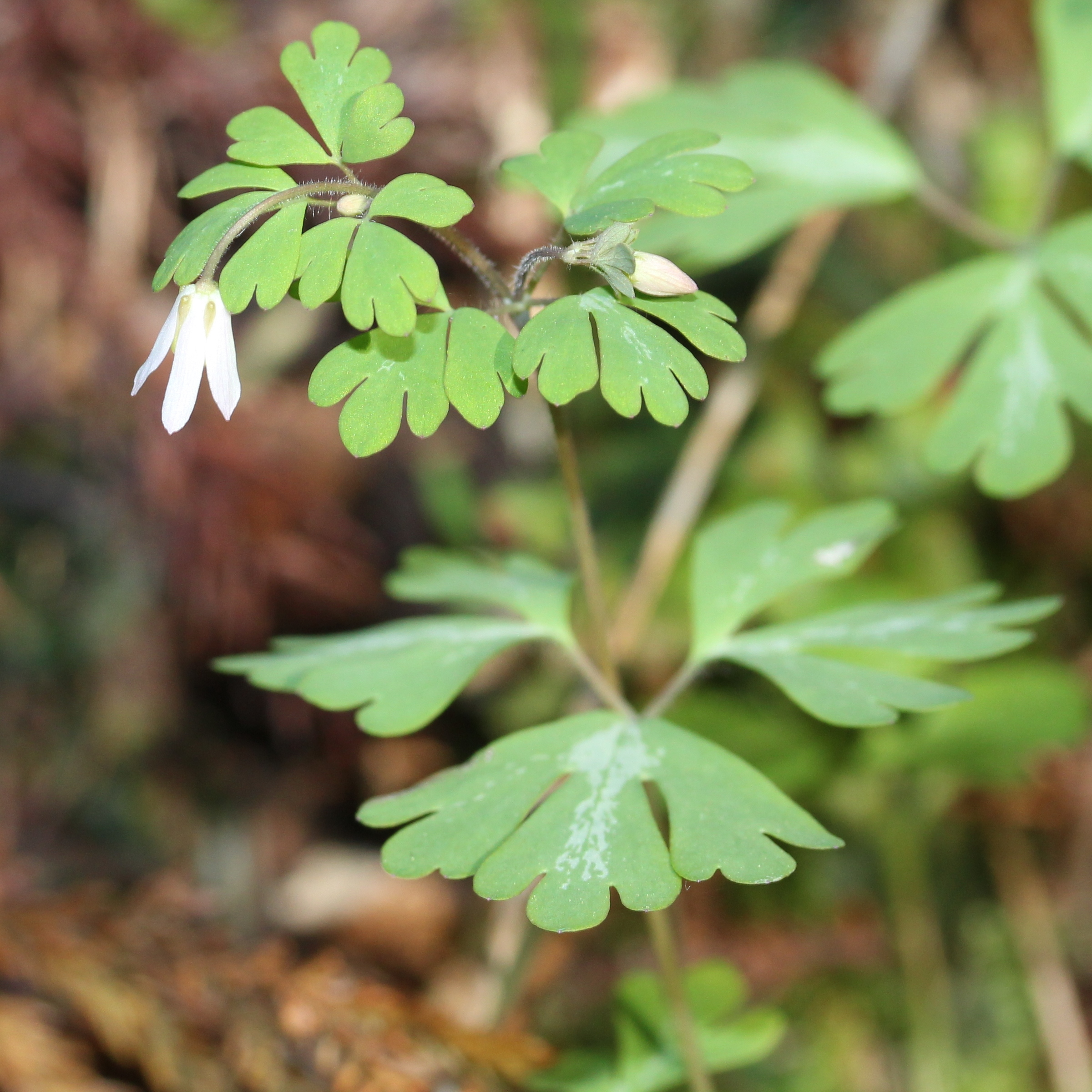
- Semiaquilegia adoxoides

Scientific classification
- Kingdom: Plantae
- Clade: Embryophytes
- Clade: Tracheophytes
- Clade: Spermatophytes
- Clade: Angiosperms
- Clade: Eudicots
- Order: Ranunculales
- Family: Ranunculaceae
- Subfamily: Thalictroideae
- Genus: Semiaquilegia; Makino

Species
- Semiaquilegia adoxoides (DC.) Makino [1902]; Semiaquilegia danxiashanensis L.Wu, J.J.Zhou, Qiang Zhang & W.S.Deng [2019]; Semiaquilegia guangxiensis Yan Liu & Y.S.Huang [2017]; Semiaquilegia quelpaertensis D.C.Son & K.H.Lee [2017]

= Semiaquilegia =

Genus of flowering plants

Semiaquilegia is a genus of flowering plants of the family Ranunculaceae, native to eastern Asia. The genus was first proposed by the botanist Tomitaro Makino in 1902. Most authorities generally hold that there is only one species in the genus, Semiaquilegia adoxoides, though other species have been proposed as members. The Royal Botanic Gardens, Kew's Plants of the World Online accepts four species of Semiaquilegia.

== Description ==
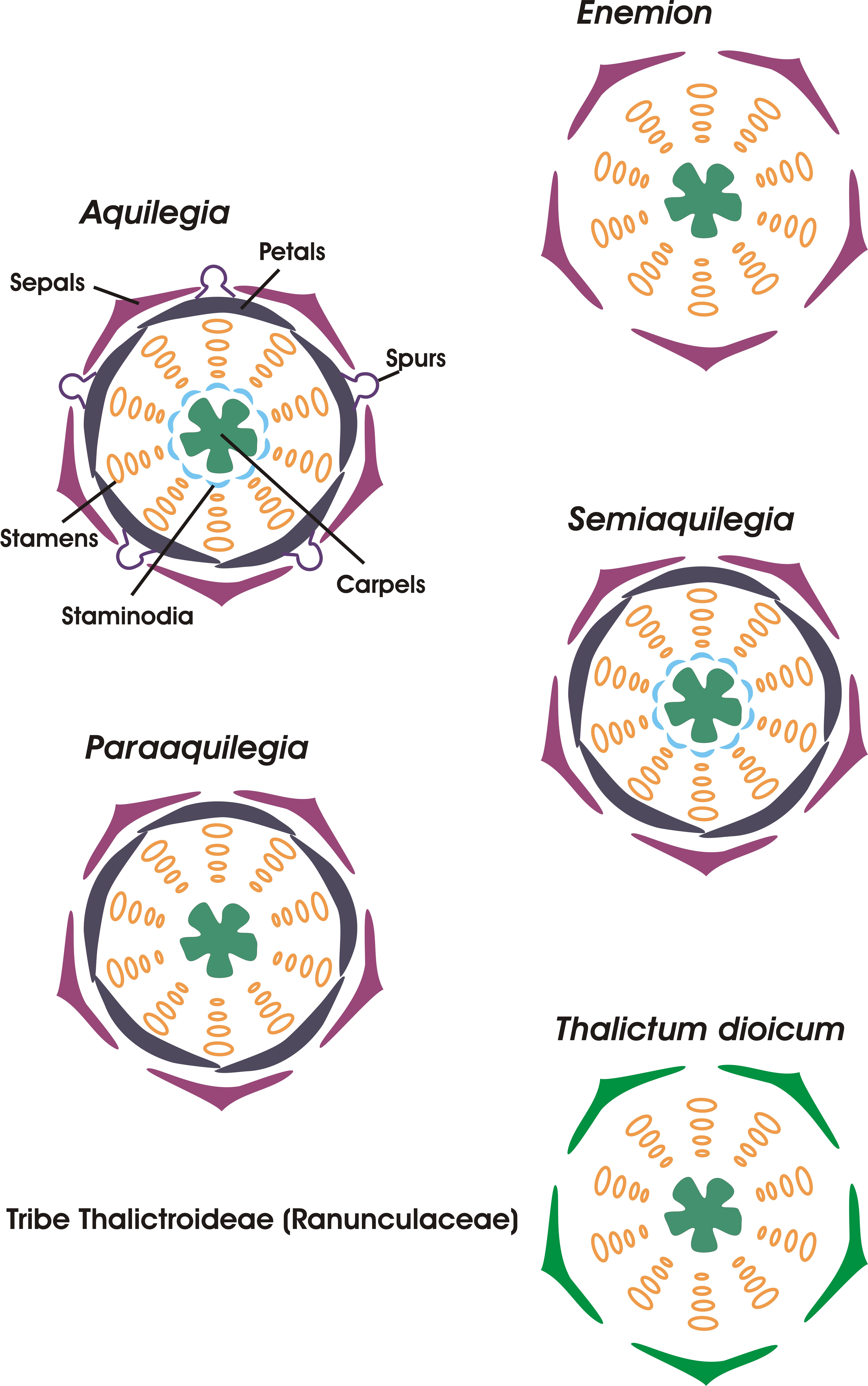
Patterns of floral morphology in the subfamily Thalictroideae

The genus Semiaquilegia are perennial herbaceous plants of the Ranunculaceae family. The plants possess tuberous roots. The arrangement of the leaves is basal (protruding from the stem's base) and cauline (attached to aerial stem). Some small leaves will grow on the flower stem during the early summer.

Semiaquilegia plants flower, with flowers that are actinomorphic (possess radial symmetrical). These flowers possess five petaloid sepals and five petals. The petals are in a basally gibbous arrangement. There are 8 to 14 stamens. Characteristic of the genus, inner stamen can resemble flattened staminodes. The anthers are yellow. While Semiaquilegia flowers can resemble those of Aquilegia, Semiaquilegia flowers lack nectar spurs or possess extremely short spurs.

Fruit appear in groups of three to five follicles that diverge. The seeds of the genus are colored brown to black-brown and heavily wrinkled.

== Taxonomy ==
The Japanese botanist Tomitaro Makino proposed the establishment of Semiaquilegia as a genus in 1902. Makino assessed the characteristics of the genus as approximating the appearance of plants in the genus Aquilegia, but with several distinctions. Among the features of Semiaquilegia that Makino identified were the absence of nectar spurs, the presence of fewer than 15 stamens, and possession of inner stamens that look like flattened staminodes.

In 1920, the British botanists James Ramsay Drummond and John Hutchinson published a paper, "A Revision of Isopyrum (Ranunculaceae) and Its Nearer Allies", in the Royal Botanic Gardens, Kew's Bulletin of Miscellaneous Information to address problems that had developed within the genus Isopyrum. In order to address the substantial morphological variance that had coexisted within Isopyrum, Drummond and Hutchinson segregated out the genus Paraquilegia and expanded Semiaquilegia to include species formerly identified as Isopyrum: S. Eastwoodiae (now Aquilegia micrantha var. mancosana) S. simulatrix (now Aquilegia ecalcarata), and S. Henryi (now Urophysa henryi). (Note: Capitalization per 1920 text.) The American botanist and gardener Robert Nold referred to the 1920 expansion of Semiaquilegia to four species as "rather less fortunate". These new Semiaquilegia have been subsequently removed from the genus, with only S. adoxoides accepted as part of the genus by 2003.

=== Etymology ===
The generic name Semiaquilegia is derived from the name for the genus Aquilegia (columbines), to which they are closely related, and literally translates as "half-columbines".

== Species ==
Species are regularly described, synonymized, or reassigned to other genera, so presently only one is considered valid by most authorities: the type species Semiaquilegia adoxoides. There are four species accepted by the Royal Botanic Gardens, Kew's Plants of the World Online:

- Semiaquilegia adoxoides (DC.) Makino [1902]
- Semiaquilegia danxiashanensis L.Wu, J.J.Zhou, Qiang Zhang & W.S.Deng [2019]
- Semiaquilegia guangxiensis Yan Liu & Y.S.Huang [2017]
- Semiaquilegia quelpaertensis D.C.Son & K.H.Lee [2017]

== Distribution ==
Semiaquilegia is native to East Asia. If the genus is understood as only encompassing Semiaquilegia adoxoides, its range extends across China, Japan, and Korea.

== Cultivation ==
According to the Alpine Garden Society, Semiaquilegia are well-suited to pot cultivation at alpine houses. The plants require well-drained soil and can be short-lived. Propagation can be achieved by sowing seeds when they are fresh and in the spring. Division can also be used in propagation, if performed carefully.
