= Piperia =

Former genus of orchids

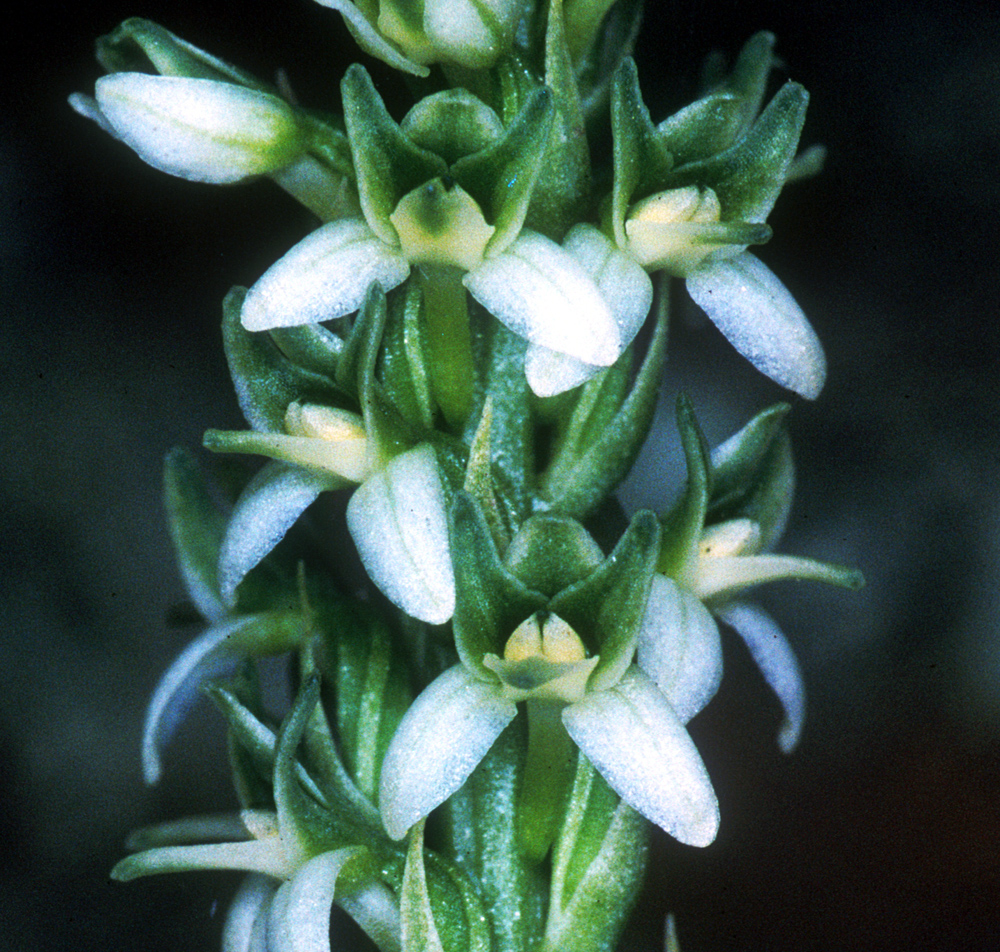
Platanthera yadonii, formerly Piperia yadonii

Piperia is a former genus within the orchid family Orchidaceae that has since been subsumed under Platanthera.

These plants are known as rein orchids. They are native to western North America, especially California and the Pacific Northwest. This former genus has the following characteristics: (a) a bisexual perennial nongreen plant that grows from buried tubers; fruit capsule bearing numerous minute seeds; (c) pollen that is sticky, and which is removed as sessile anther sacs; and (d) stigma fused with its style into a column. There were a total of ten species in the genus Piperia, which is named for American botanist Charles V. Piper. The genus members manifest generally cylindrical spikes or racemes.

The subsurface architecture of these terrestrial wild orchids consists of a rhizome structure, from which emanate tubers. The rhizome extracts nutrients from fungal intermediates and may also store some of these nutrients. A basal rosette of leaves develops from the tuber at the surface of the soil, each of the two or three leaves being lanceolate in shape. Each leaf ranges from 10 to 15 centimeters in length and 20 to 35 millimeters in width. Leaves of younger plants are often more diminutive in size.

Below are the ten former species of Piperia and their currently accepted names:

- Piperia candida - Platanthera ephemerantha
- Piperia colemanii - Platanthera colemanii
- Piperia cooperi - Platanthera cooperi
- Piperia elegans - Platanthera elegans
- Piperia elongata - Platanthera elongata
- Piperia leptopetala - Platanthera leptopetala
- Piperia michaelii - Platanthera michaelii
- Piperia transversa - Platanthera transversa
- Piperia unalascensis - Platanthera unalascensis
- Piperia yadonii - Platanthera yadonii
