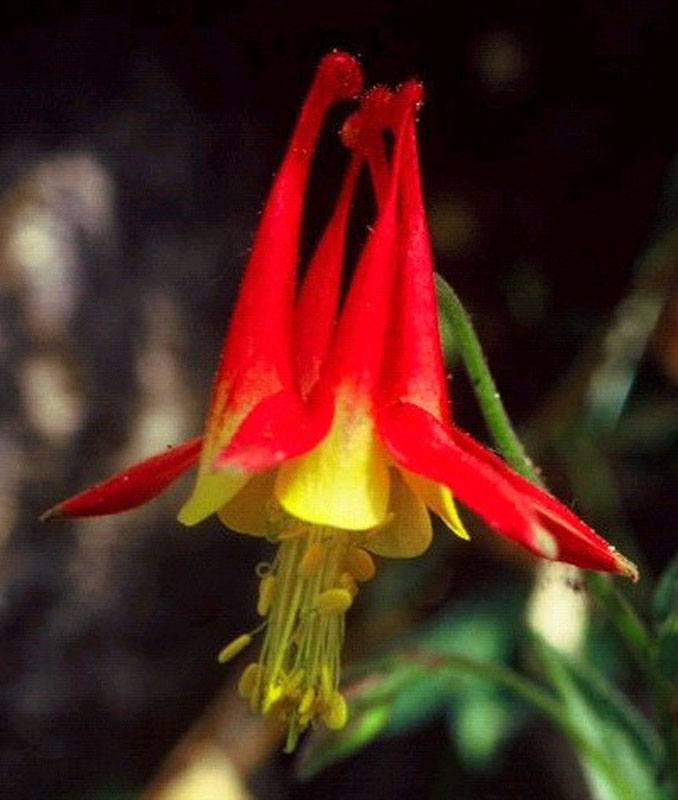

Conservation status
- Imperiled (NatureServe)

Scientific classification
- Kingdom: Plantae
- Clade: Tracheophytes
- Clade: Angiosperms
- Clade: Eudicots
- Order: Ranunculales
- Family: Ranunculaceae
- Genus: Aquilegia
- Species: A. micrantha
- Variety: A. m. var. grahamii

Trinomial name
- Aquilegia micrantha var. grahamii (S.L. Welsh & Goodrich) N.H. Holmgren & P.K.Holmgren
- Location of Hole in the Wall Canyon in Uintah County, Utah, one of three adjacent canyons that constitute the native range of Aquilegia micrantha var. grahamii

Synonyms
- Aquilegia grahamii S.L.Welsh & Goodrich

= Aquilegia micrantha var. grahamii =

Variety of flowering plant native to the US

Aquilegia micrantha var. grahamii, common name Graham's columbine, is a variety of perennial flowering plant in the family Ranunculaceae, endemic to Utah in the United States.

== Description ==
Aquilegia micrantha var. grahamii grows to 25–60 cm (9.8–23.6 in) tall with glandular stems. The leaves are mainly basal, 4–24 cm (1.6–9.4 in) long, biternate, sticky, and glandular. The plant produces 2–6 or more nodding flowers, somewhat longer than broad. The sepals are red-fuchsia in colour, measure 11–13 mm (0.43–0.51 in) long, and spread horizontally. The petals have clear yellow blades 5–6 mm (0.20–0.24 in) long with red-fuchsia nectar spurs of 18–21 mm (0.71–0.83 in). The stamens protrude beyond the petals by a further 9–13 mm (0.35–0.51 in).

== Taxonomy ==
Aquilegia micrantha var. grahamii was originally described in 1993 by Stanley Larson Welsh and Sherel Goodrich as a separate species, Aquilegia grahamii. They noted in their description that all glandular varieties of Aquilegia were previously classified as Aquilegia micrantha on that basis, ignoring, in their view, other features of the plant and phytogeography. However, in 2012 Noel Herman Holmgren and Patricia Kern Holmgren reclassified the plant as a variety of Aquilegia micrantha, an interpretation now favoured by authorities such as the International Plant Names Index.

=== Etymology ===
The variety name (and former specific epithet) grahamii honours Edward Harrison Graham (1902–1966), the botanist who first collected specimens of the plant in 1935.

== Distribution and habitat ==
Graham's columbine is endemic to three adjacent deep, shaded canyons in on the south slope of the Uinta Mountains north of Vernal, in eastern Uintah County of northeast Utah, in and near to Ashley National Forest. It grows in sandy soil below sandstone cliffs at an altitude of 1,980–2,320 m (6,500–7,610 ft).

== Ecology ==
Aquilegia micrantha var. grahamii flowers in June and July and is associated with Calamagrostis scopulorum (ditch reed grass).

== Conservation ==
As of November 2024, NatureServe listed Aquilegia micrantha var. grahamii (under the name Aquilegia grahamii) as Imperiled (G2) worldwide. This status was last reviewed on July 26, 2021.

The species appears to be safe from immediate threat from humans due to its steep isolated habitat in protected lands, although some of its range may intersect a phosphate mine. It relies on spring water to survive so may be at risk from recent droughts in the state.
