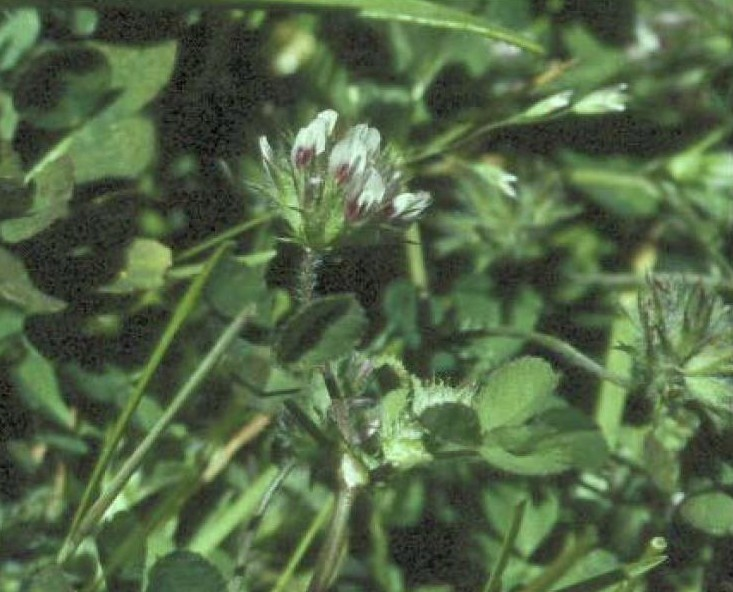

Conservation status
- Critically Imperiled (NatureServe)

Scientific classification
- Kingdom: Plantae
- Clade: Embryophytes
- Clade: Tracheophytes
- Clade: Angiosperms
- Clade: Eudicots
- Clade: Rosids
- Order: Fabales
- Family: Fabaceae
- Subfamily: Faboideae
- Genus: Trifolium
- Species: T. trichocalyx

Binomial name
- Trifolium trichocalyx A.Heller

= Trifolium trichocalyx =

Species of plant

Trifolium trichocalyx is a species of clover known by the common name Monterey clover.

== Distribution ==
Trifolium trichocalyx is endemic to Monterey County, California, where it is known only from the Monterey Peninsula, in a closed-cone pine forest habitat.

It occurs in the Del Monte Forest with flora associates Potentilla hickmanii and Piperia yadonii. This species is listed as endangered by the U.S. Federal Government and the state of California.

== See also ==
- Trifolium dubium
