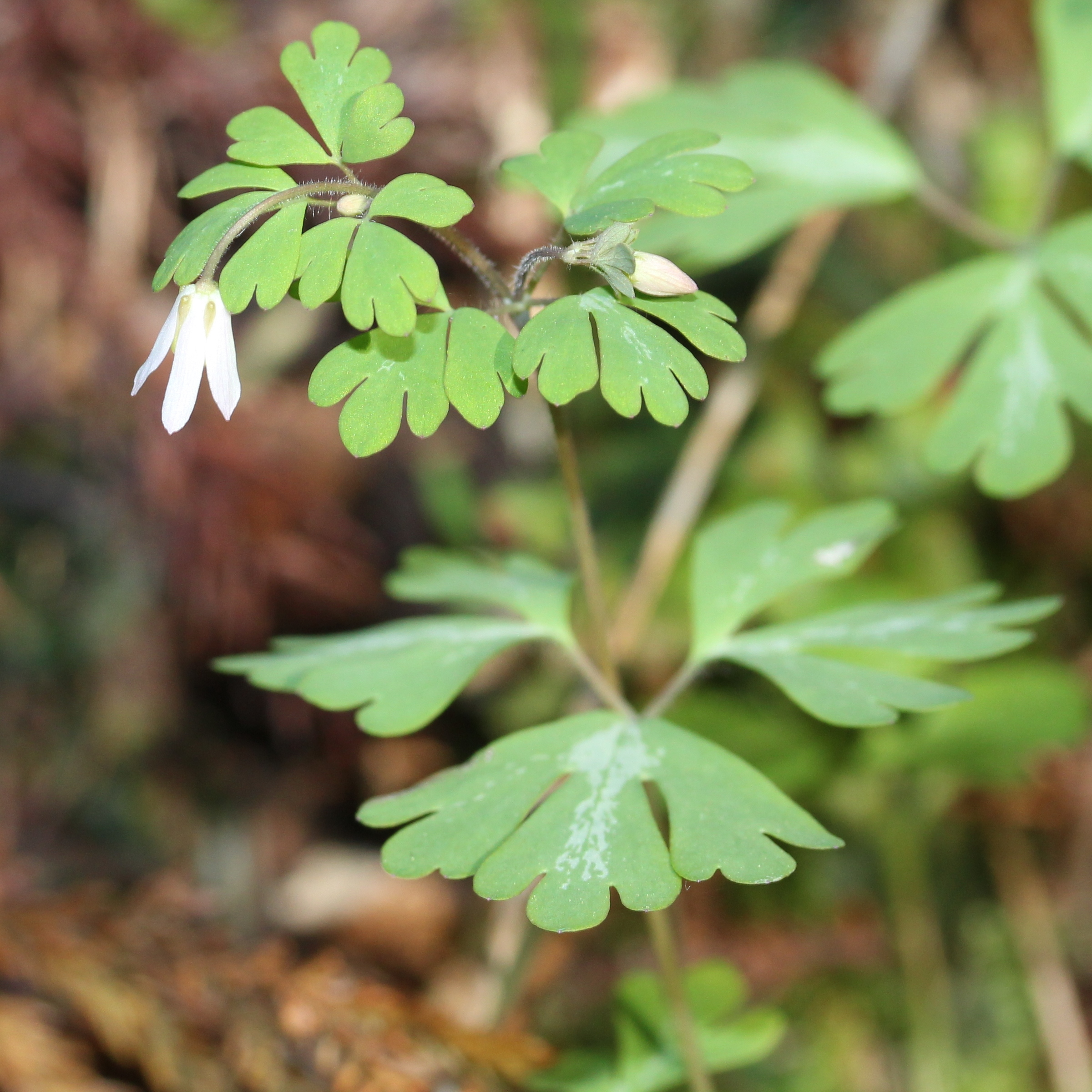

Scientific classification
- Kingdom: Plantae
- Clade: Tracheophytes
- Clade: Angiosperms
- Clade: Eudicots
- Order: Ranunculales
- Family: Ranunculaceae
- Genus: Semiaquilegia
- Species: S. adoxoides

Binomial name
- Semiaquilegia adoxoides (DC.) Makino

Synonyms
- Isopyrum adoxoides DC.; Aquilegia adoxoides (DC.) Ohwi

= Semiaquilegia adoxoides =

Species of flowering plant

Semiaquilegia adoxoides is a species of perennial flowering plant in the family Ranunculaceae. The species is native to Japan, Korea, and China, Now often considered the sole member of the genus Semiaquilegia, it bears similarities to members of the genus Aquilegia. S. adoxoides is native to China, Korea, and Japan and has an introduced population on Taiwan.

S. adoxoides can grow to about 40 cm (16 in) tall. The plant produces flowers that are usually white with purple tinging. Blooms occurs in March and April.

== Description ==
Semiaquilegia adoxoides is a perennial herb in the genus Semiaquilegia in the family Ranunculaceae. Its tuberous roots can be 1 cm (0.39 in) to 2 cm (0.79 in) long and 3 mm (0.12 in) to 6 mm (0.24 in) in diameter.

The plant flowers in March and April. The flowers are between 4 mm (0.16 in) and 6 mm (0.24 in) in diameter. The flowers extend from the inflorescence on pubescent pedicels that are between 1 cm (0.39 in) and 2.5 cm (0.98 in) long. The five petaloid sepals are generally white with purple tinging. The sepals have dimensions of 4 mm (0.16 in) to 6 mm (0.24 in) long and 1.2 mm (0.047 in) to 2.5 mm (0.098 in) wide. There are five spatulate petals on each flower.

All members of Semiaquilegia are hermaphroditic. Fruiting occurs in S. adoxoides during April and May. Plants of the genus produce seeds in divergent follicles. The seeds are densely rugose (wrinkly) and colored brown to black-brown. Each seed is about 1 mm (0.039 in) long.

== Taxonomy ==
The species was first described as a member of the genus Isopyrum by the Swiss botanist Augustin Pyramus de Candolle in 1818. In 1902, the Japanese botanist Tomitaro Makino segregated the genus Semiaquilegia and reclassified the species as Semiaquilegia adoxoides. In 1946, the American botanist Philip A. Munz rejected Makino's identification of Semiaquilegia as a distinct genus and reassigned the species to Isopyrum. Despite this, S. adoxoides remains accepted as the name for the species and is sometimes considered the sole example of the genus.

== Distribution ==
Semiaquilegia adoxoides is considered native to central and southeastern China, Korea, and Japan. The species has an introduced population on Taiwan.

== Cultivation ==
In 1946, Munz observed that S. adoxoides (which he considered an Isopyrum) was occasionally sold by nurseymen for cultivation in the United States, though these plants were erroneously labeled as Aquilegia ecalcarata.
