= Little River Nature Park =

- Interactive map of Little River Nature Park
- Location: Vancouver Island, British Columbia, Canada
- Nearest city: Comox
- Coordinates: 49°44′14″N 124°55′12″W
- Established: 2009
- Governing body: Comox Valley Regional District

Little River Nature Park is a protected area on the eastern shore of Vancouver Island in the Comox Valley Regional District. It is home to beaches, man-made ponds, an estuarine marsh, and well-drained forests dominated by Douglas-fir. The park is underlain by sand and gravel which was locally extracted in open pits; these have since become the ponds.

A 1959 soil map identifies the following complex unit: Kye-Coastal Beach (Ky-CB). Kye loamy sand is a classic podzol with well-defined eluvial (A_{2} or Ae) horizon. This series supports the well-drained forests. Coastal Beach land type represents bare or grassy regosol sand. A 1985 land survey maps the whole park as Raised Beach sand.

A population of the rare Seaside rein-orchid was identified on the beach. An avifauna survey found 52 bird species.
