= Phaseolus rosei =

Conservation status
- Endangered (IUCN 3.1)

Scientific classification
- Kingdom: Plantae
- Clade: Tracheophytes
- Clade: Angiosperms
- Clade: Eudicots
- Clade: Rosids
- Order: Fabales
- Family: Fabaceae
- Subfamily: Faboideae
- Genus: Phaseolus
- Species: P. rosei

Binomial name
- Phaseolus rosei Piper

Species of legume

Phaseolus rosei is a species of legume in the family Fabaceae. It is found only in Ecuador. Its natural habitat is subtropical or tropical dry shrubland.
