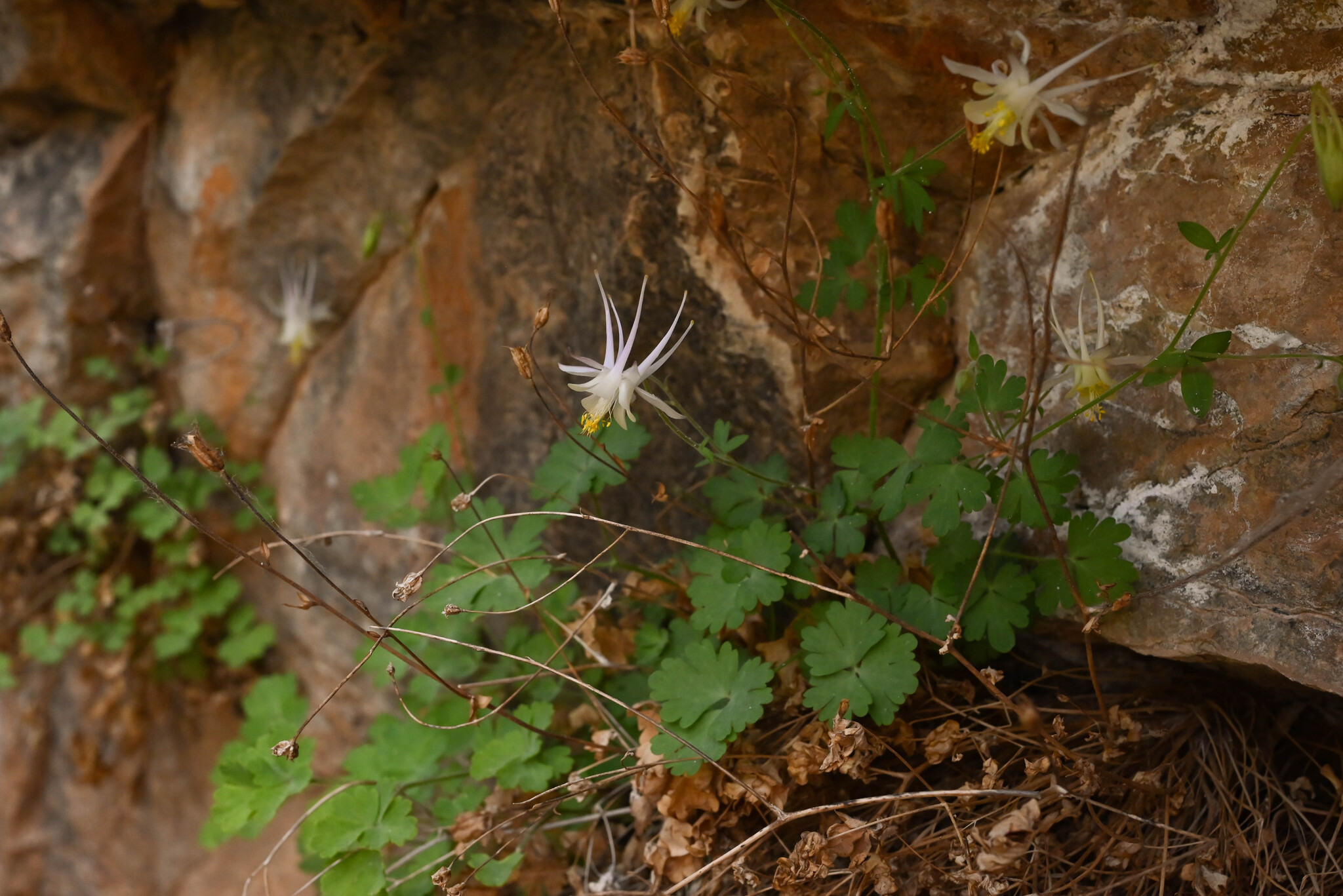
- Blooming near Paradox, Colorado

Conservation status
- Secure (NatureServe)

Scientific classification
- Kingdom: Plantae
- Clade: Embryophytes
- Clade: Tracheophytes
- Clade: Angiosperms
- Clade: Eudicots
- Order: Ranunculales
- Family: Ranunculaceae
- Genus: Aquilegia
- Species: A. micrantha

Binomial name
- Aquilegia micrantha Eastw. (1895)

Varieties
- Aquilegia micrantha var. grahamii (S.L.Welsh & Goodrich) N.H.Holmgren & P.K.Holmgren; Aquilegia micrantha var. loriae (S.L.Welsh & N.D.Atwood) N.H.Holmgren & P.K.Holmgren; Aquilegia micrantha var. micrantha

Synonyms
- List: Aquilegia ecalcarata var. micrantha (Eastw.) Payson ex Kearney & Peebles; Aquilegia ecalcarata subsp. micrantha (Eastw.) Payson

= Aquilegia micrantha =

Species of flowering plant

Aquilegia micrantha, the Mancos columbine or Bluff City columbine, is a perennial species of flowering plant in the family Ranunculaceae. It is native to Utah, Colorado, and Arizona. The species grows to between 30 cm (12 in) and 60 cm (24 in) tall and produces flowers that can be white, cream, blue, or pink. The species's flowers bloom during the spring and summer, from April to September. Also known as the alcove columbine, the species can be found on the on steep stone walls in the hanging gardens of the Colorado Plateau and Canyonlands.

A. micrantha was used as a medicinal herb by the Navajo and Kayenta peoples. It was first described by the American botanist Alice Eastwood, who initially discovered a spurless variety (Aquilegia micrantha var. mancosana) of the species in 1891.

== Description ==
Aquilegia micrantha is a perennial herb in the Aquilegia (columbine) genus of the Ranunculaceae family. The species features substantial variance. The stems grow to between 30 cm (12 in) and 60 cm (24 in) in height and between 1 mm (0.039 in) and 3 mm (0.12 in) thick. The leaves projecting from the base of the stem are bi- or triternately compound. Both the stems and the leaves can be slightly hairy.

Aquilegia flowers possess five sepals and five petals. In the wild, A. micrantha flowers bloom during the spring and summer, with blooms spanning between April and September. These flowers are nodding or erect and can have white, cream, blue, or pink sepals. The American botanist Philip A. Munz reported that reddish sepals had also been observed. The sepals measure from 8 mm (0.31 in) to 20 mm (0.79 in) in length. The blades are white or cream and 6 mm (0.24 in) to 10 mm (0.39 in) long. The stamens extend beyond the blades by between 3 mm (0.12 in) and 5 mm (0.20 in).

The nectar spurs are 15 mm (0.59 in) to 30 mm (1.2 in) long and straight with the tips of the spurs curving inward. They are white or colored like the sepals. A spurless form of the species, Aquilegia micrantha var. mancosana, is also known.

The flowers of Aquilegia plants are all bisexual. Fruiting in the genus produces cylindrical follicles. On A. micrantha, these follicles are between 10 mm (0.39 in) and 20 mm (0.79 in) long. The species produces seeds that are 1 mm (0.039 in) long.

== Ecology ==
A study published in 1983 on pollination of Aquilegia micrantha in the upper Crystal River Canyon in Colorado identified several pollinators. The most effective pollinators observed were bumblebee queens of the species Bombus appositus and Bombus flavifrons which sought nectar from A. micrantha. Hummingbirds and hawkmoths also visited A. micrantha plants, with hummingbirds known to be the most important pollinators at other sites. The study speculated that the infrequency in bumblebees visiting red-flowered Aquilegia elegantula plants was a mechanism to prevent hybridization between them and A. micrantha.

== Taxonomy ==
In 1946, Munz evaluated findings from a 1918 assessment of the genus by the American botanist Edwin Blake Payson alongside further, latterly collected evidence. According to Munz, four species that Payson had identified – A. rubicunda, A. lithophila, A. pallens, and A. ecalarata var. micrantha – were instead all part of the one species A. micrantha. Munz compared this assessment to the encompassing nature of fellow columbine species Aquilegia chrysantha, Aquilegia pubescens, and Aquilegia shockleyi.

=== Names ===
The genus name Aquilegia may come from the Latin word for "eagle", aquila, in reference to the petals' resemblance to eagle talons. Aquilegia may also derive from aquam legere, which is Latin for "to collect water", or aquilegium, a Latin word for a container of water. The specific name micrantha means "small-flowered", from Greek μικρός "small" + ἄνθος "flower, blossom".

The word columbine derives from the Latin word columbinus, meaning "dove", a reference to the flowers' appearance of a group of doves. The usual common name Mancos columbine is taken from the town of Mancos, Colorado, from where the type specimen was sent by Alfred Wetherill (brother of Richard Wetherill) to the describer of the species, Alice Eastwood. Wetherill noted in his letter to Eastwood that it was similar enough to Aquilegia ecalcarata that he at first took it for that species.

=== Eastwood's spurless columbine ===
Eastwood had seen a spurless columbine from the head Mesa Verde National Park's Johnston Canyon, about 25 mi (40 km) from Mancos, in 1891. She described its locale as a single shaded, dry cavern within the canyon where the plant relied on its proximity to the damp stones to survive. From 1892 until at least 2003, the spurless form was not seen in the wild, leading to it being presumed extinct. Two specimens of the variety were collected by Stephen O. Myers on 23 June 2008 at the same type locality as those of the 1890s. These specimens are currently in the herbariums of the University of Northern Colorado and the Denver Botanic Gardens.

The American botanist and gardener Robert Nold, referring to the spurless Johnson Canyon columbine, said "[t]he taxonomic history of Alice Eastwood's columbine is a peculiar one". While Eastwood described this species as Aquilegia ecalcarata, that name had been applied to another species of columbine two years earlier. In 1893, the American geologist and botanist Marcus E. Jones assigned the columbine to a new section, Pseudaquilegia, though this section was not accepted by the taxonomic community. Eastwood's later discovered spurred forms of the columbine and renamed the species to A. micrantha, describing the Johnston Canyon columbine as A. micrantha mancosana. This spurless columbine is now thought to be a spurless A. micrantha variety, assigned the names A. micrantha var. mancosana and A. micrantha var. micrantha.

=== Varieties ===
Three varieties are accepted according to the Royal Botanic Gardens, Kew's Plants of the World Online (POWO):

- Aquilegia micrantha var. grahamii (S.L.Welsh & Goodrich) N.H.Holmgren & P.K.Holmgren – Graham's columbine, Utah
- Aquilegia micrantha var. loriae (S.L.Welsh & N.D.Atwood) N.H.Holmgren & P.K.Holmgren – Lori's columbine, Utah
- Aquilegia micrantha var. micrantha – Utah, Colorado, and northern Arizona

While A. m. var. mancosana is recognized as a synonym of A. m. var. micrantha by POWO, A. m. var. mancosana is recognized as a distinct variety by other authorities.

== Distribution and habitat ==
Aquilegia micrantha is endemic to the Southwestern United States (southeastern Utah, southwestern Colorado, and extreme northern Arizona). The species grows only on hanging gardens in the canyons of the Colorado Plateau and Canyonlands where alkaline water seeps from the bases of cliffs. Its favored elevations are between 1,000 m (3,300 ft) and 2,500 m (8,200 ft). This range places it within the ecological environment known as the juniper belt.

Due to a lack of any genetic barriers to hybridization in Aquilegia, the species hybridize wherever their ranges overlap. Hybridization occurs with A. elegantula on the eastern limits of A. micrantha's range.

=== Conservation ===
As of 2025, Plants of the World Online – utilizing the Angiosperm Extinction Risk Predictions v1 – predicted the extinction risk for Aquilegia micrantha as "not threatened" with a confidence level of "confident". The plant's NatureServe conservation status – last reviewed in 1984 – is G5, meaning its global population is considered "secure". The population of A. micrantha in Colorado was simultaneously evaluated and has a status of S5, identifying it also as "secure".

== Uses ==
Aquilegia micrantha has been used by the Navajo and Kayenta peoples to assist in childbirth.
