= Aquilegia incurvata =

Scientific classification
- Kingdom: Plantae
- Clade: Tracheophytes
- Clade: Angiosperms
- Clade: Eudicots
- Order: Ranunculales
- Family: Ranunculaceae
- Genus: Aquilegia
- Species: A. incurvata

Binomial name
- Aquilegia incurvata P.K.Hsiao

Chinese species of columbine

Aquilegia incurvata, or the Qinling columbine (秦岭耧斗菜), is a perennial species of flowering plant in the family Ranunculaceae, endemic to the Qinling mountain range in China.

== Description ==
Aquilegia incurvata grows to 40–60 cm (16–24 in) tall, with branched stems sparsely covered with downy hairs. The basal leaves are biternate. It produces 2–5 flowers measuring around 22 mm (0.9 in) in diameter, having purple sepals 14–18 mm (0.6–0.7 in) in length, and purple petals 7–8 mm long with strongly inwardly-curving nectar spurs measuring a further 12–15 mm (0.5–0.6 in).

== Taxonomy ==
=== Etymology ===
The specific epithet incurvata means "curved inwards" in Latin, referring to the spurs of the flowers.

== Distribution and habitat ==
The species is only found in the Qinling mountain range in southern Gansu, southern Shaanxi, and northeastern Sichuan provinces of China, where it grows on grassy slopes and in grassy places by streams at altitudes of 1,000–2,000 m (3,300–6,600 ft).

== Ecology ==
Aquilegia incurvata flowers from May to June, and is pollinated by bumblebees.

== Conservation ==
The species has not been assessed for the IUCN Red List.
