= Charles Piper =

American botanist (1867–1926)

Charles Vancouver Piper
- Born: June 16, 1867
- Died: February 11, 1926 (aged 58)
- Citizenship: American
- Education: Washington State University; Harvard University
- Known for: Soybean
- Scientific career
- Fields: Botany
- Workplaces: USDA

Charles Vancouver Piper (16 June 1867 – 11 February 1926) was an American botanist and agriculturalist.

== Early life and education ==
Born in Victoria, British Columbia, Canada, he spent his youth in Seattle, Washington Territory and graduated from the University of Washington Territory in 1885. He taught botany and zoology in 1892 at the Washington Agricultural College (now Washington State University) in Pullman. He earned a master's degree in botany in 1900 from Harvard University.

== Biography ==
Piper compiled the first authoritative guides to flora in the northwestern United States. With his collaborator, R. Kent Beattie, he surveyed the Palouse area of southeastern Washington, and expanded the study to the entire state in 1906. That year, The Smithsonian Institution published his catalog Flora of the State of Washington. He also published Flora of Southeast Washington and Adjacent Idaho (1914) and Flora of the Northwest Coast (1915). These works established him as an authority on the plants of the northwestern U.S. In 1902, he issued and distributed bryophyte specimens in an exsiccata-like series entitled Musci Occidentali-Americani.

In 1903, Piper began a career at the U.S. Department of Agriculture in Washington, D.C., which lasted until his death there. He worked on the domestication and introduction of grasses. On a trip to Africa, he found Sudan grass and introduced it to North America as a forage plant (vegetable matter eaten by livestock). Piper noted that much less study had been made of forage crops as compared to cotton, cereals, and other crops. He attributed this to the lack of economic incentive in studying forage plants.

He was a founding member of the American Society of Agronomy in 1907 and served later as its president. Piper's knowledge of grasses led him to become Chairman of the United States Golf Association's Green Section from 1920 until his death.

The orchid genus Piperia, containing eight species (e.g., Piperia yadonii), is named after him.

== Soy research ==
The soybean was another subject of Piper's studies. In 1923, he wrote, with William Joseph Morse, The Soybean, a thorough and now classic monograph of the species. The botanist was instrumental in establishing this plant as a successful crop in the U.S. It became a fundamental part of U.S. agriculture. Since the 1970s, it has been the second largest and most valuable crop in the United States after corn - and ahead of wheat.
