= Rocky Creek (Wisconsin) =

Stream in Wisconsin, USA

Coordinates: 44°27′43″N 90°08′34″W

Rocky Creek is a stream in the U.S. state of Wisconsin. It is a tributary to Yellow River.

Variant names have been "Rocky Run" and "Rocky Run Creek". The creek was named for its rocky character.
