= Rocky Creek (Current River tributary) =

Stream in the U.S. state of Missouri

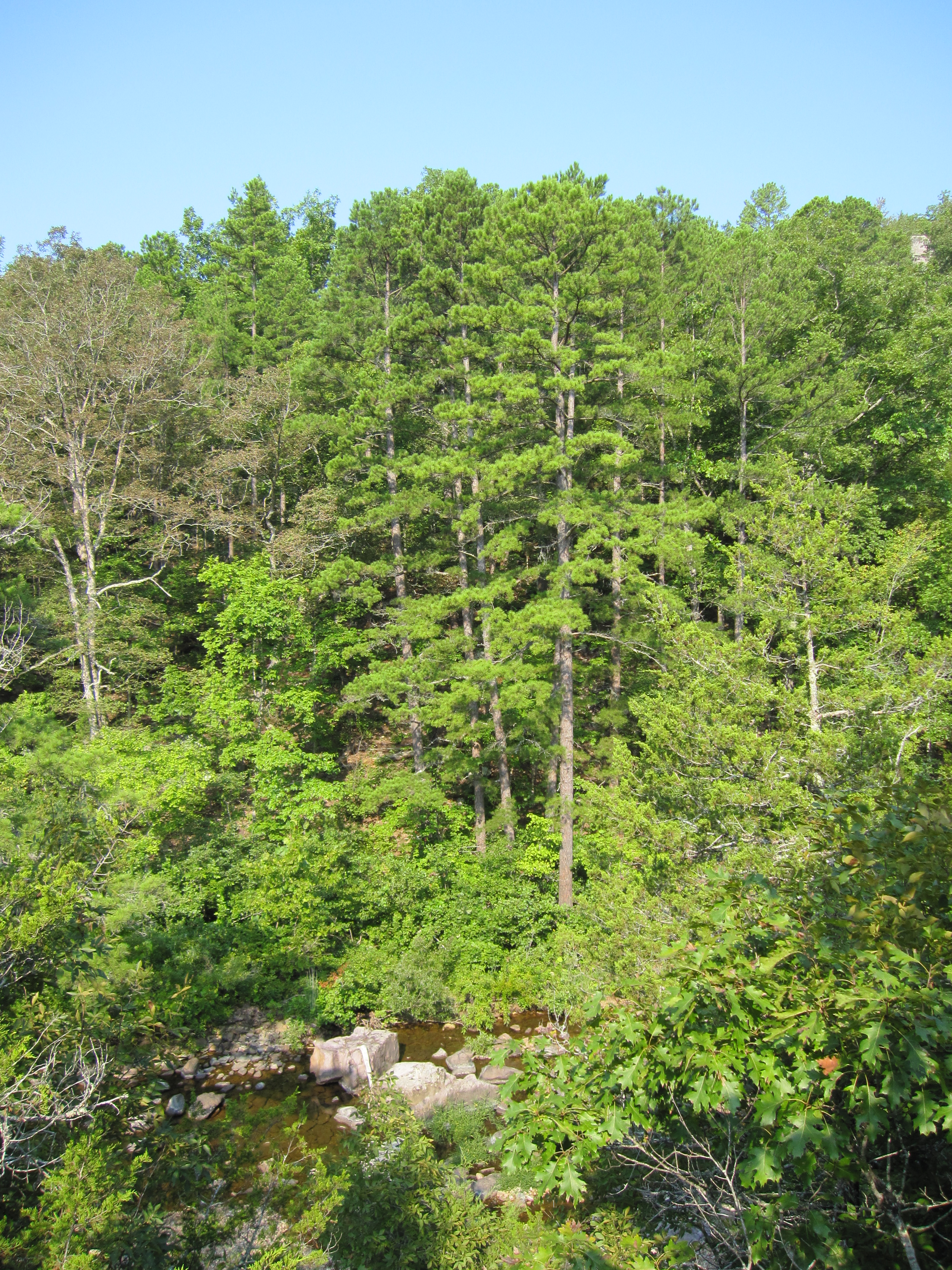
Rocky Creek near Mill Mountain.

Rocky Creek is a stream in southeastern Shannon County in the Ozarks of southern Missouri. It is a tributary of the Current River.

The stream headwaters are at 37°03′20″N 91°16′48″W and the confluence with the Current is at 37°07′35″N 91°10′18″W.

Rocky Creek was so named for the rocky character of its creek bed.

== See also ==
- List of rivers of Missouri
