= Rocky Creek (Texas) =

- Location within Texas Location within the United States

Physical characteristics
- Source
  - coordinates: 28.9302778°N 97.2080556°W
- Mouth
  - coordinates: 28.8813748°N 97.1308221°W

Rocky Creek is a stream in Victoria County, Texas, in the United States.

Rocky Creek was named from the rocky character of its creek bed.

== See also ==
- List of rivers of Texas
