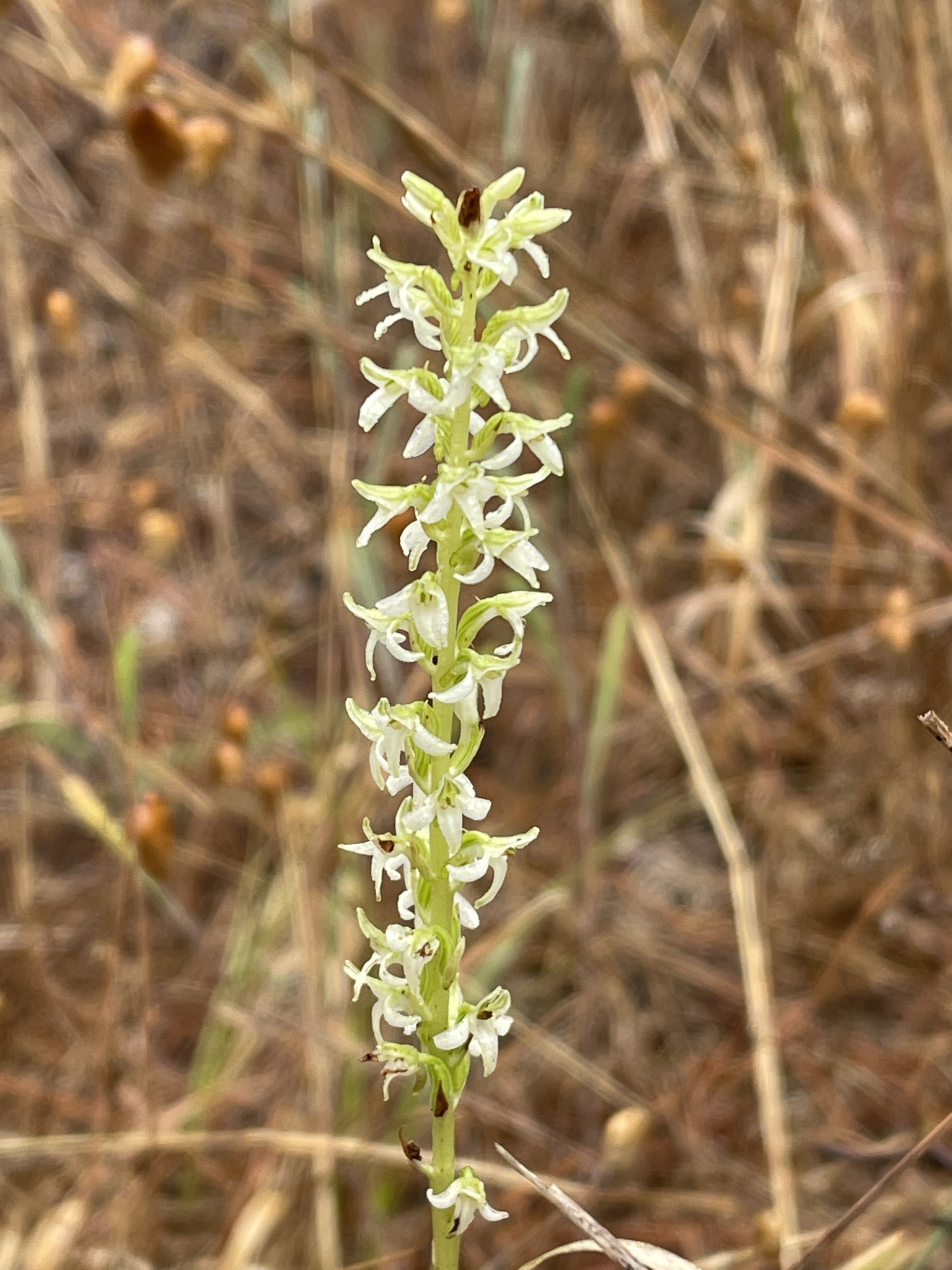

Conservation status
- Critically Imperiled (NatureServe)

Scientific classification
- Kingdom: Plantae
- Clade: Embryophytes
- Clade: Tracheophytes
- Clade: Angiosperms
- Clade: Monocots
- Order: Asparagales
- Family: Orchidaceae
- Subfamily: Orchidoideae
- Genus: Platanthera
- Species: P. yadonii

Binomial name
- Platanthera yadonii (Rand.Morgan & Ackerman) R.M.Bateman

Synonyms
- Piperia yadonii Rand.Morgan & Ackerman

= Platanthera yadonii =

Species of orchid

Platanthera yadonii, also known as Yadon's piperia or Yadon's rein orchid, is an endangered orchid endemic to a narrow range of coastal habitat in northern Monterey County, California. In 1998 this plant was designated as an endangered species by the United States government, the major threat to its survival being continuing land development from an expanding human population and associated habitat loss. One of the habitats of Yadon's piperia, the Del Monte Forest near Monterey, California, is the subject of a federal lawsuit, based upon endangerment of this organism along with several other endangered species.

This wildflower may lie dormant in a given year and not emerge above the soil surface from its tuberous substructure. After leafing out in the spring, it will produce flowers on erect spikes, each flower possessing both green and white petals. It prefers sandy soils, and subsists on nutrient extraction from intermediate fungal organisms.

== Description ==
Along with most other orchids P. yadonii: (a) is a bisexual perennial green plant that grows from buried tubers; manifests a fruit capsule bearing numerous minute seeds; (b) exhibits pollen that is sticky, and which is removed as sessile anther sacs; and (c) has a stigma fused with its style into a column.

Yadon's piperia exhibits a basal rosette leaf formation.

The subsurface architecture of this terrestrial wild orchid consists of a rhizome structure, from which emanate tubers. The rhizome extracts nutrients from fungal intermediates and may also store some of these nutrients. A basal rosette of leaves develops from the tuber at the surface of the soil, each of the two or three leaves being lanceolate in shape. Each leaf ranges from 10 to 15 centimeters in length and 20 to 35 millimeters in width. Leaves of younger plants are often more diminutive in size.

The dense inflorescence is borne on a single erect vertical spike varying from 12 to 55 centimeters in height. Each flower has a spur of length 1.5 to 5 millimeters, short compared to other members of the genus. Yadon's Piperia typically presents three upper tepals, each of which contains both green and white pigmentation; moreover, there are three lower tepals that are white only. The earliest blooming time is June. When P. yadonii blooms, as late as August, all of its sepals and petals may be purely white.

Another key identification feature is the characteristically abbreviated spur, which typically measures 1.5 to 6.0 millimeters in length. P. yadonii's leaves usually wither by blooming time, except for a small percentage of very large individuals. The geographic range of P. yadonii overlaps that of P. elegans, P. elongata, P. michaelii, and P. transversa; consequently, P. yadonii is clearly distinguished from them only in the flowering stage. Sympatric occurrences in mixed populations with P. elongata and P. elegans are noted in the literature.

== Reproduction and symbiosis ==
Seeds of this species, like other orchids, lack an endosperm. The extremely small seeds must come in contact with appropriate soil fungi in order to germinate. The resulting seedlings obtain fixed carbon from the fungus until they produce their first leaves and begin to photosynthesize. This strategy is known as myco-heterotrophy. Vegetative reproduction may also occur.

== Distribution and habitat ==
Yadon's piperia is confined to a handful of locations in the coastal area of north Monterey County primarily the Del Monte Forest on the Monterey Peninsula. Tiny populations have been found in the Prunedale Hills; and an isolated southernmost population on Rocky Creek Ridge (Cushing Mountain) at Big Sur. Specific places of occurrence within those areas are the S.F.B. Morse Botanical Reserve; Manzanita County Park; and the Nature Conservancy’s Blohm Ranch Nature Preserve. Each colony is rather small in patch size, measured on the order of twenty acres or less. All of the occurrences are below about 250 meters above mean sea level and all are within six miles of the Pacific Ocean.

Yadon's piperia is generally restricted to three habitats: (a) Monterey pine (Pinus radiata) forest, sometimes with Gowen's cypress (Cupressus goveniana ssp. goveniana) which includes more than 80 percent of the known populations; (b) California Northern coastal scrub, with dwarfed Hooker's manzanita (Arctostaphylos hookeri ssp. hookeri) or Eastwood's manzanita (Arctostaphylos glandulosa); and (c) Monterey cypress (Cupressus macrocarpa) forest. The colonies in woodland settings are found under partial canopy in an open, primarily herbaceous understory shape.

The Monterey Peninsula and northern Big Sur areas are influenced by a marine climate that is pronounced due to the upwelling of cool water from the Monterey submarine canyon. Rainfall is 40 to 50 centimeters per year, but summer fog drip is a primary source of moisture for Yadon's Piperia and other plants that would otherwise not be able to persist with such low precipitation.

== History and conservation ==
Platanthera yadonii was named for Vern Yadon, former longtime director of the Pacific Grove Museum of Natural History. The Monterey Peninsula, where all colonies of Yadon's piperia occur, is recognized to have a high degree of species endemicism. Species with more northern ranges often reach their southern limits on the Peninsula; species with more southern affinities reach their northern limits there as well. On the Monterey Peninsula some taxa comprising habitat for P. yadonii, such as the coastal closed-cone pines and cypresses are relict stands, e.g. species that once extended more widely in the mesic climate of the late Pleistocene period, but then retreated to small pockets of cooler and wetter conditions along the coast ranges during the hotter, drier early Holocene period between 6000 and 2000 BC.

Yadon's piperia, along with certain other threatened species in the northern California Floristic Province, has been designated as a species meriting protection by the U.S. Government, State of California, local governments and private conservation groups. These designations have led to blueprints for protection of Yadon's piperia in the form of official endangerment classifications and a species Recovery Plan, the latter promulgated by the U.S. Fish and Wildlife Service. Even with all these efforts, the total current population is not necessarily above the minimum viable population without further elements of protection.

The listing as a federally endangered species occurred in 1998, prompted by a study conducted by Earth Metrics for the city of Monterey, which found the colony in the Del Monte forest to be threatened by proposed land development. Subsequently, in 1995 the U.S. Fish and Wildlife Service acted on this new information regarding Yadon's piperia, and promulgated a notice of intent to classify the species as endangered.

Monitoring populations of Yadon's piperia is challenging since each tuber does not produce emergent leaves or flowers in a given year. To complicate matters further, the plant can only be identified conclusively in its flowering stage, and yet, even when the plant leafs out, it may not necessarily produce a flower in a given year. Furthermore, by the time a flower is produced, the leaves have typically senesced; thus, a survey conducted during the flowering season will miss plants that have leafed out but not flowered.

== See also ==
- Platanthera elegans
- Hickman's potentilla
- Minimum viable population
