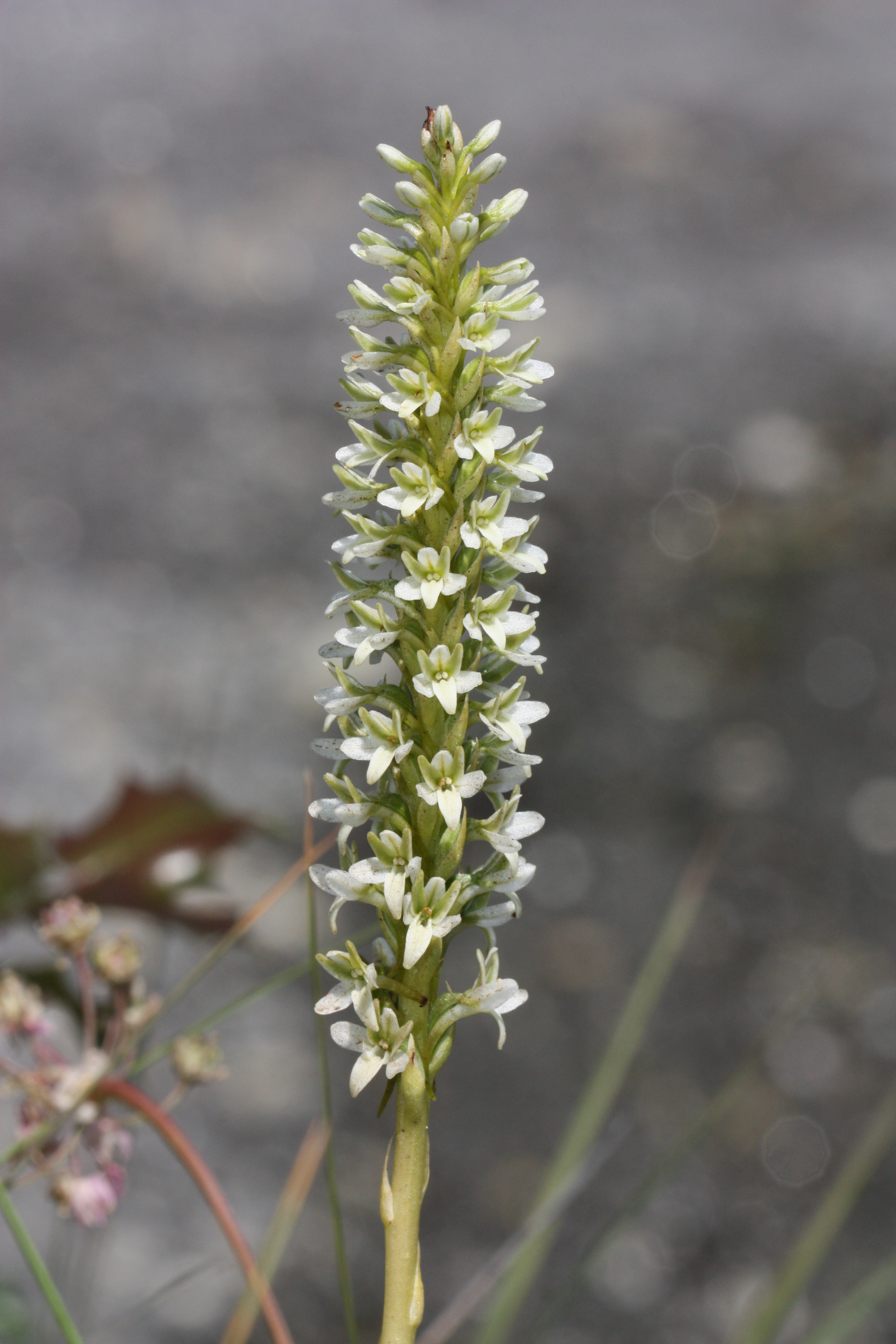

Scientific classification
- Kingdom: Plantae
- Clade: Embryophytes
- Clade: Tracheophytes
- Clade: Spermatophytes
- Clade: Angiosperms
- Clade: Monocots
- Order: Asparagales
- Family: Orchidaceae
- Subfamily: Orchidoideae
- Genus: Platanthera
- Species: P. elegans

Binomial name
- Platanthera elegans Lindl.

Synonyms
- Piperia elegans; Piperia maritima; Piperia multiflora

= Platanthera elegans =

Species of plant

Platanthera elegans is a species of orchid known by several common names, including elegant piperia, coast piperia, hillside rein orchid, and hillside bogorchid. This is a showy flowering plant native to western North America. It grows from a caudex tuber and sends up a thick stem just under a meter in maximum height. The stem is topped with a cylindrical spike inflorescence of densely packed flowers with curving white to greenish-yellow petals. Coastal individuals are noticeably thicker and have more flowers than those that grow further inland; it is uncertain if these are variants, subspecies, or even separate species. They are both currently treated as P. elegans. Other species of Plantanthera, notably the endangered species P. yadonii are quite similar in appearance to some populations of this species.
