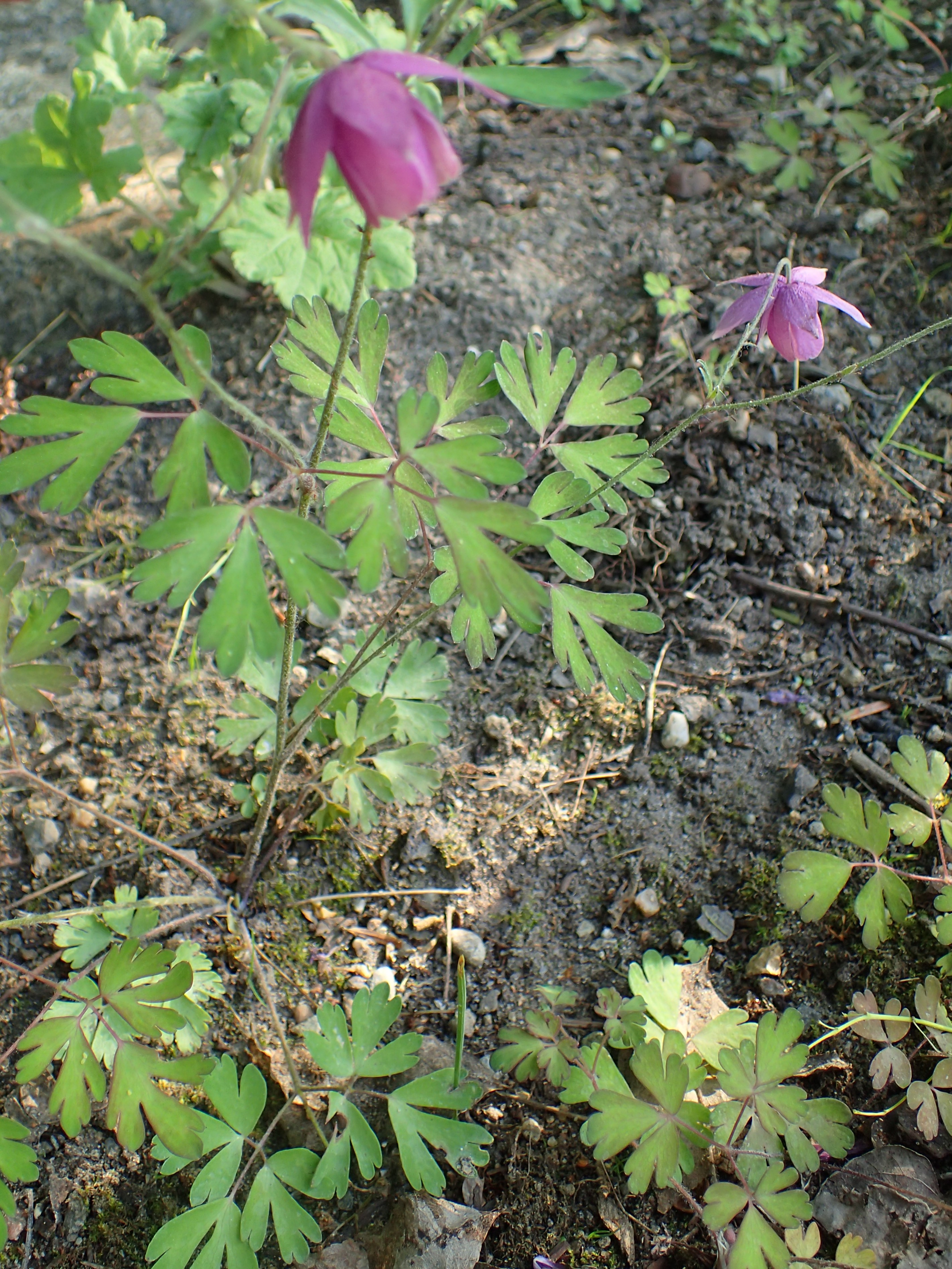
- At the Berlin Botanical Garden and Botanical Museum
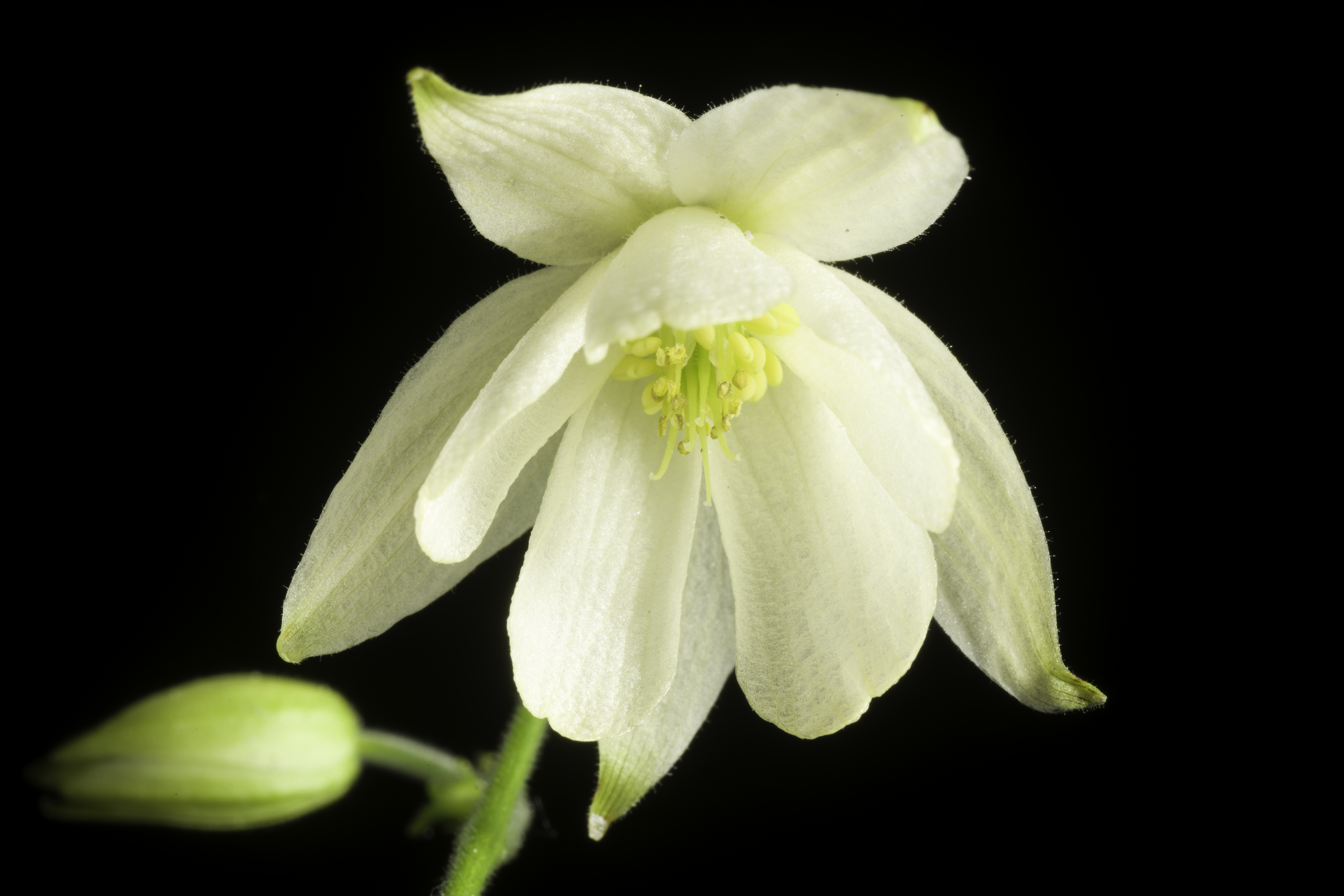
- A white-flowered specimen

Scientific classification
- Kingdom: Plantae
- Clade: Tracheophytes
- Clade: Angiosperms
- Clade: Eudicots
- Order: Ranunculales
- Family: Ranunculaceae
- Genus: Aquilegia
- Species: A. ecalcarata

Binomial name
- Aquilegia ecalcarata Maxim.

Synonyms
- Aquilegia ecalcarata f. semicalcarata (Schipcz.) Hand.-Mazz.; Aquilegia semicalcarata (Schipcz.) Erst; Semiaquilegia ecalcarata (Maxim.) Sprague & Hutch.; Semiaquilegia ecalcarata f. semicalcarata Schipcz.; Semiaquilegia simulatrix J.R.Drumm.

= Aquilegia ecalcarata =

Chinese endemic species of columbine

Aquilegia ecalcarata, the spurless columbine or false columbine, is a perennial species of flowering plant in the family Ranunculaceae, native to central China. In cultivation, it is known as Semiaquilegia ecalcarata.

== Description ==
Aquilegia ecalcarata grows to 20 to 60 cm (8 to 24 in) (rarely 80 cm (31 in)) tall, with one to four downy stems and biternate basal leaves. The flowers are 15–28 mm (0.6–1.1 in) in diameter with sepals and petals, usually purple in colour and, uniquely among Aquilegia species, lacking a nectar spur.

== Taxonomy ==
Because of its lack of nectar spurs, the species has previously been classified in the genus Semiaquilegia or posited as an ancestor to the Aquilegia genus. However, phylogenetic study suggests that it belongs to a Euro-Asiatic lineage of Aquilegia and is most closely related to another Chinese species Aquilegia yabeana, and therefore has likely lost its spurs over time, probably as a result of its being pollinated by hoverflies rather than bees.

There is some evidence that the species may be polyphyletic and in fact consist of two lineages that independently evolved a spurless form.

=== Etymology ===
The specific epithet ecalcarata is Latin for "without a spur, spurless", from e- "without" and calcarata "spurred, having a spur", referring to the lack of nectar spurs in the species.

== Distribution and habitat ==
Aquilegia ecalcarata is endemic to central China, found in Gansu, Guizhou, Henan, Hubei, Ningxia, Qinghai, Shaanxi, Sichuan, and eastern Tibet. It grows in stony environments along the slopes or peaks of mountains or by riversides, and in sparse forests, scrub, and grassy slopes at altitudes of 1,800–3,500 m (5,900–11,500 ft).

== Ecology ==
The species flowers in May to June and is pollinated by hoverflies. Although its habitat overlaps with that of Aquilegia incurvata and A. yabeana, the species have different pollinators and therefore have remained distinct and do not hybridize, an example of sympatric speciation.

== Conservation ==
The species has not been assessed for the IUCN Red List.

== Cultivation ==
As its synonym Semiaquilegia ecalcarata it has gained the Royal Horticultural Society's Award of Garden Merit.
