= Nectar spur =

Hollow extension of a part of a flower

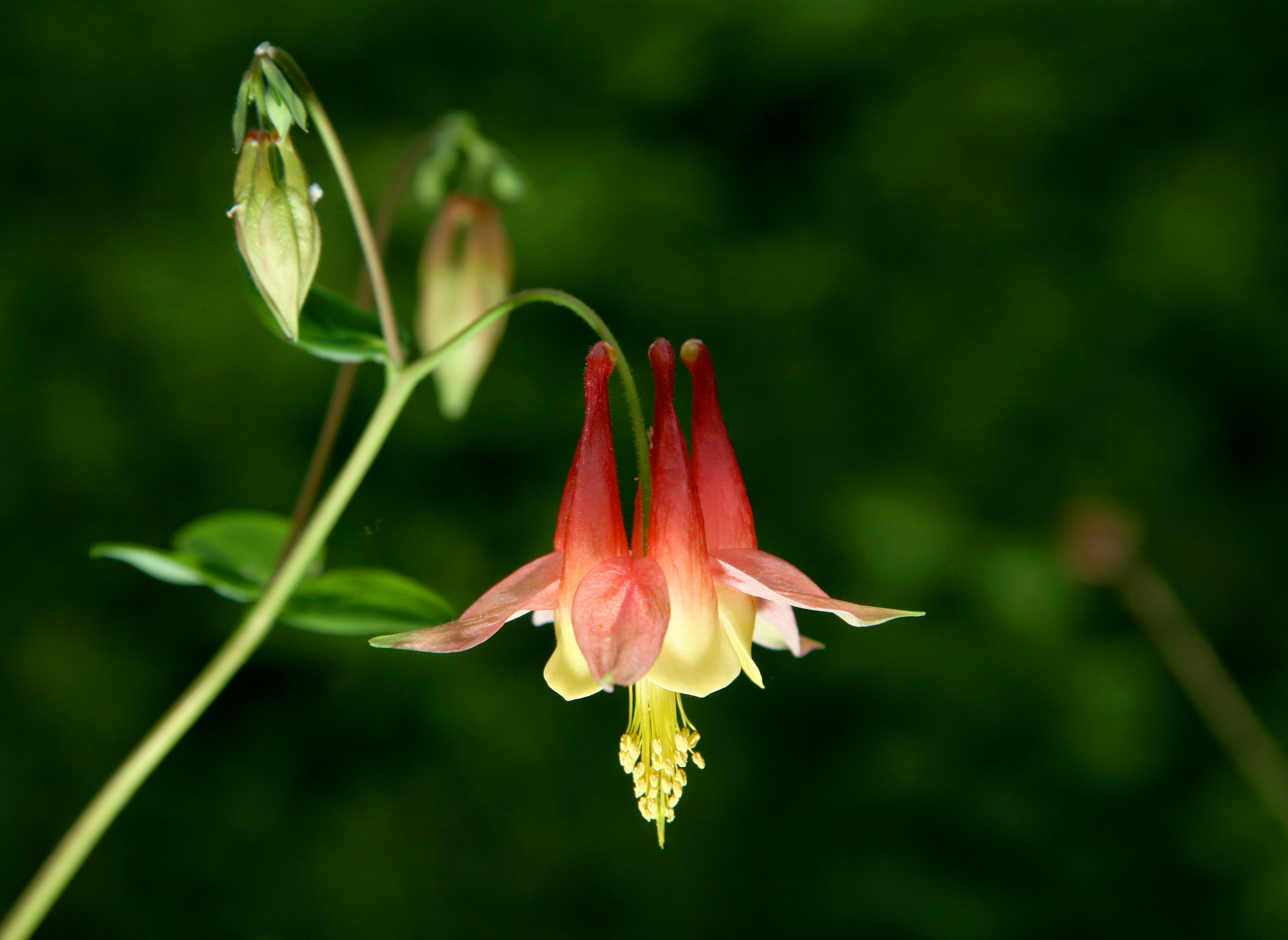
Nectar spurs on Aquilegia.

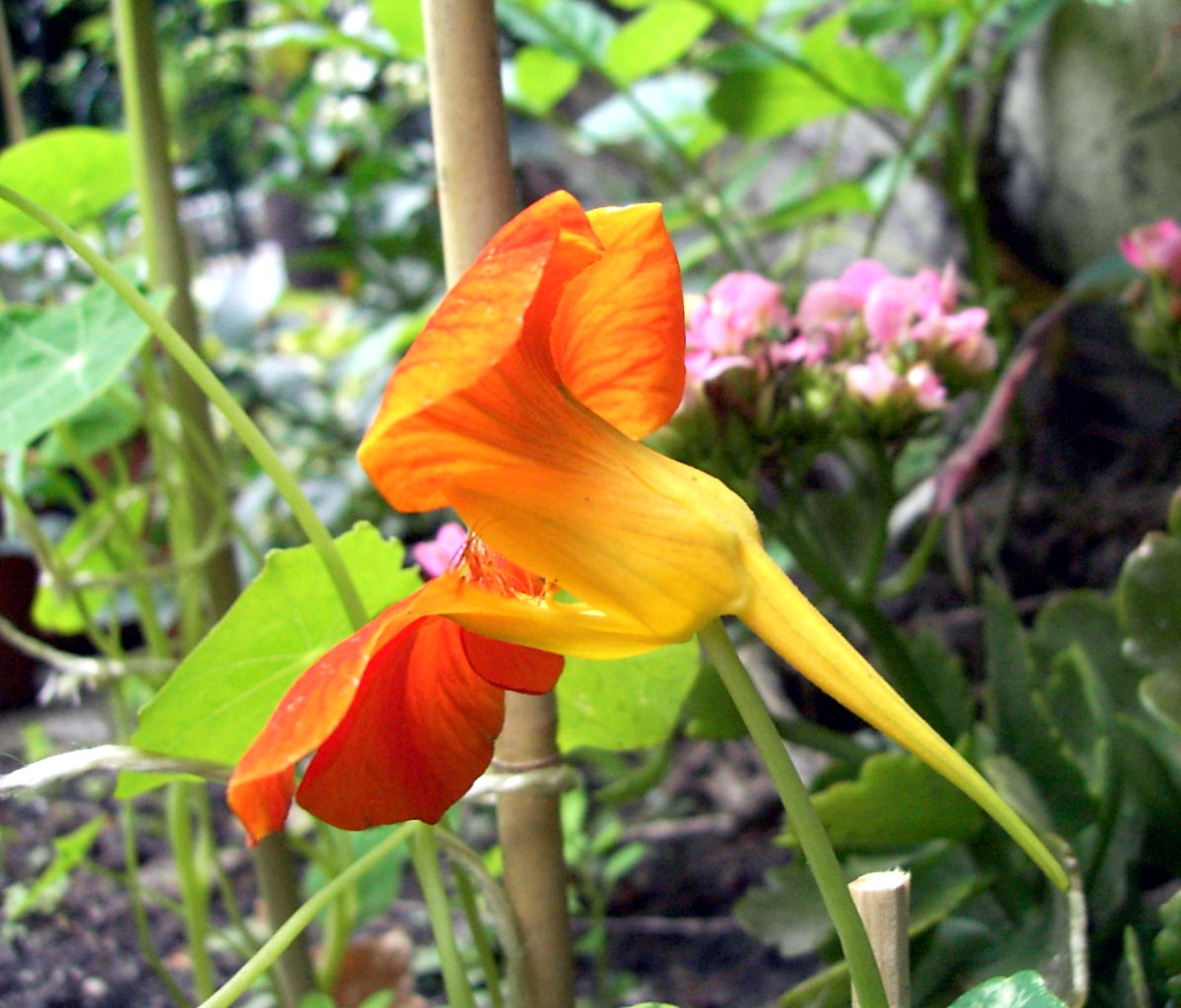
Side view of Tropaeolum majus, a plant with a nectar spur arising from the hypanthium of the flower.

A nectar spur is a hollow extension of a part of a flower. The spur may arise from various parts of the flower: the sepals, petals, or hypanthium, and often contain tissues that secrete nectar (nectaries). Nectar spurs are present in many clades across the angiosperms, and are often cited as an example of convergent evolution.

== Taxonomic significance ==
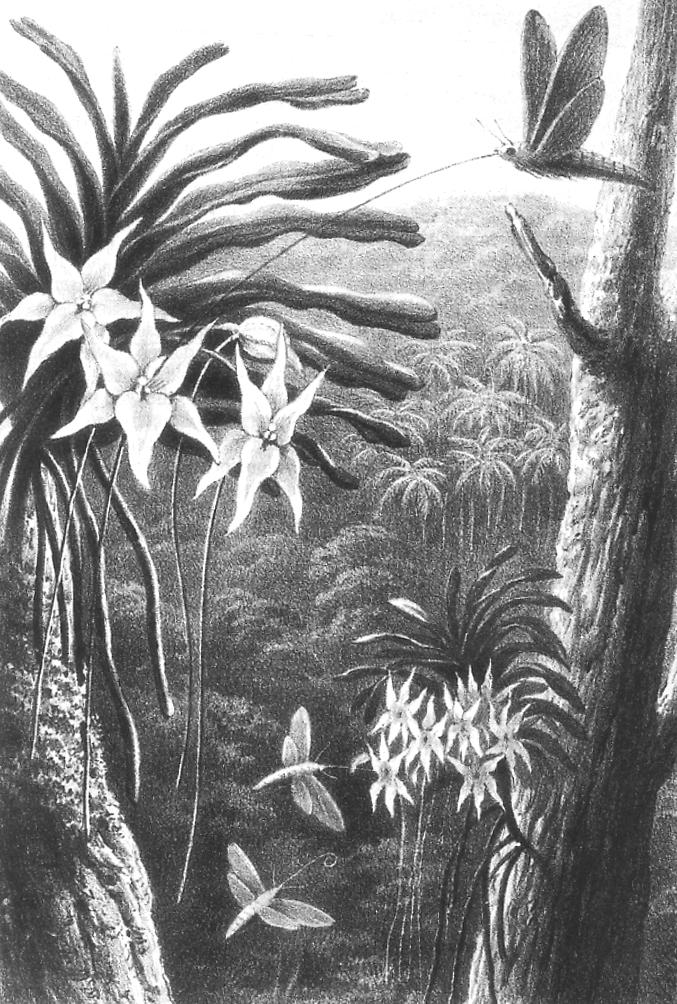
The long tongue of a sphinx moth is depicted as reaching into the equally long-spurred orchid.

Spur length can be an important diagnostic character for taxonomy, useful in species identification. For example, Yadon's piperia can be distinguished from Platanthera elegans, an extremely similar species in section Piperia (Orchidaceae), by the unusually short length of its spur.

== Ecology and evolution ==
The presence of nectar spurs in a clade of plants is associated with evolutionary processes such as coevolution (two-sided evolution) and pollinator shifts (one-sided evolution). Like variations in floral tube length, variation in nectar spur length has been associated with variation in the lengths of organs on the primary pollinators of the plants, whether being the tongues of moths, the proboscis of flies, or the beaks of hummingbirds. This variation in floral shape can restrict access of pollinators to nectar, limiting the range of potential pollinators.

In a famous historical story, Darwin predicted that the Angraecum sesquipedale, an orchid with an extremely long spur, must be pollinated by a pollinator with an equally long proboscis. The pollinator, the sphinx moth Xanthopan morganii praedicta, was found and described 40 years after Darwin made his prediction.

Nectar spurs have been cited as prime examples of "key innovations" that may promote diversification, and play a part in the adaptive radiation of clades. Columbines (Aquilegia) have been studied in depth for the link between their floral nectar spurs and their rapid evolutionary radiations. However, there has also been some refutation to this idea recently, suggesting that the adaptive radiation of Aquilegia may have been due more to climate and habit than to the varying lengths of the nectar spurs.

== Underlying development and genetics ==
In terms of development, the varying lengths of nectar spurs has been found to be based solely on the anisotropic elongation of cells. However, it still remains to be understood which genes underlie the elongation of cells to form a spur: are the same genes being co-opted over and over again across the angiosperms to form spurs, or are there several developmental pathways to make a spur?

The genetic basis underlying the development of nectar spurs has been explored in several clades of plant families, such as Linaria and Aquilegia. Studies in model plant Antirrhinum and Arabidopsis identified that type I KNOX SHOOTMERISTEMLESS (STM) genes play a role in the development of spur-like structures. These type I KNOX STM genes also play important roles in the development of the growing tip of the plant, the shoot apical meristem, by controlling cell division and prolonging indeterminate growth. Subsequent gene expression studies confirmed that orthologues of the type I KNOX genes are expressed in the petals of Linaria, a genus of plants with a spur arising from the ventral petal. However, the type I KNOX homologues were not differentially expressed during spur development on the petals of Aquilegia, while certain TCP genes instead were suggested to play a role. These results suggest that nectar spurs may represent a case of convergent evolution on the genetic level, where the nectar spur has developed through different developmental pathways.

== List of plants with nectar spurs ==
The following is an incomplete list of plant clades with nectar spurs.

- Orchids: Satyrium, Disa, Angraecum, Aerangis, Neofinetia, Piperia
- On petals: Aquilegia, Delphinium, (Note: Delphinium has two spurs on the upper petals and one spur on the upper sepal. The sepaline spur is not a nectar spur because it has no nectar.) Lentibulariaceae, Viola, Fumarioideae
- On sepals: Impatiens
- From hypanthium: Tropaeolum
