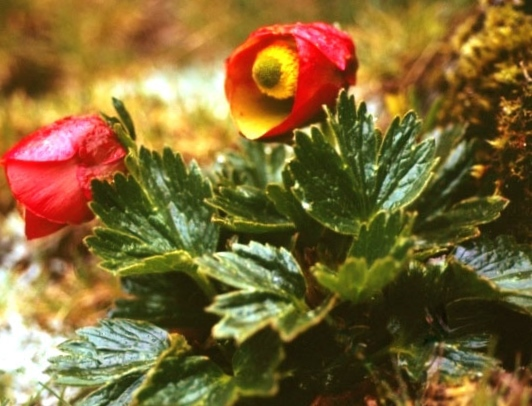

Scientific classification
- Kingdom: Plantae
- Clade: Tracheophytes
- Clade: Angiosperms
- Clade: Eudicots
- Order: Ranunculales
- Family: Ranunculaceae
- Genus: Krapfia
- Species: K. weberbaueri

Binomial name
- Krapfia weberbaueri (Ulbr.) Standl. & J.F. Macbr.

Synonyms
- Rhopalopodium weberbaueri Ulbr.; Ranunculus weberbaueri (Ulbr.) Lourteig

= Krapfia weberbaueri =

Species of plant

Krapfia weberbaueri is a plant in the family Ranunculaceae. It is endemic to Peru.

== Description ==
Krapfia weberbaueri is a perennial herb with basal leaves ranging from 10–30 cm (3.9–11.8 in) in length that grow in clumps of 3-5. Its flowers grow up to 5 cm (2.0 in) in diameter.
