= List of Aquilegia species =

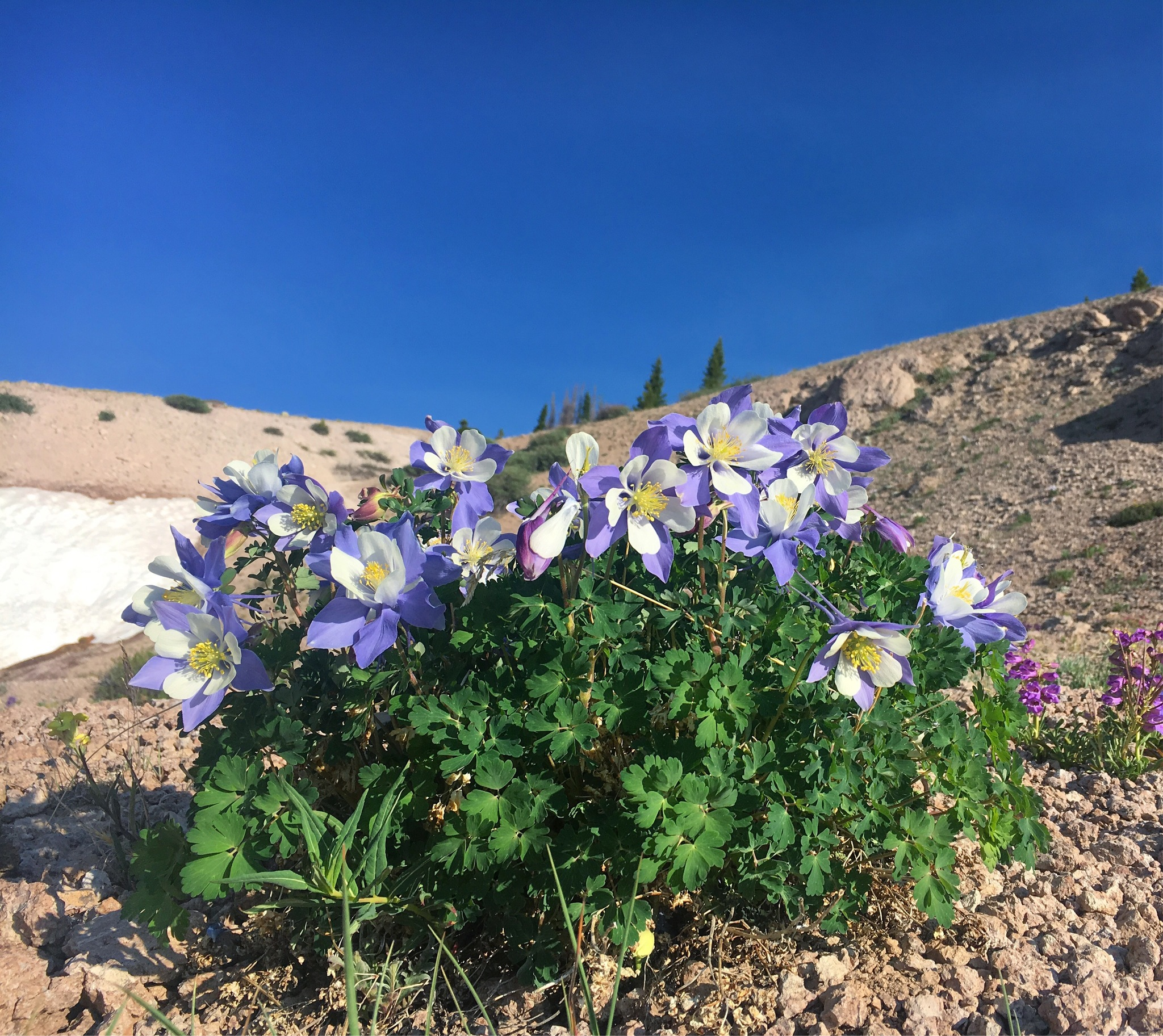
A flowering Aquilegia coerulea plant in Colorado, United States

Aquilegia, commonly known as columbines, is a genus comprising 130 species according to the Royal Botanic Gardens, Kew's Plants of the World Online as of May 2025. According to different taxonomic authorities, the genus Aquilegia comprises between 70 and over 400 taxa. Some totals correspond more closely with Philip A. Munz's 1946 total of 67, while online Tropicos and the International Plant Names Index have totals of over 200 and 500, respectively.

The American botanist and gardener Robert Nold attributed the substantial total of named species, subspecies, and varieties to the 19th-century practice of assigning names to even minutely distinct specimens. However, Nold also held that overly broad species could increase the number of varietal names. The Italian botanist Enio Nardi stated that authors assessing Aquilegia as containing fewer than 100 species "either mask or underestimate their splitting into subspecies, many of which were originally described at the species level" and remain accepted as species in taxonomic indices.

The type species of the genus is A. vulgaris, a European columbine with high levels of physical variability. Most European Aquilegia are morphologically similar to A. vulgaris, sometimes to the point where visually them discerning from A. vulgaris is difficult. However, A. vulgaris is also considered to encompass Iberian and North African columbines that are not accepted as separate species for reasons that Nardi said were founded in "tradition, more cultural than scientific".

== List of taxa ==
Aquilegia

- - - - A. amurensis
      - - A. parviflora
        - A. japonica
    - - A. jonesii
      - - - - A. brevistyla
            - A. canadensis
        - - - - A. scopulorum
              - - A. pubescens
                - - A. eximia
                  - - A. flavescens
                    - A. formosa
            - A. chrysantha
            - - A. longissima
              - A. skinneri
              - - A. elegantula
                - A. coerulea
- - - A. yabeana
    - - A. rockii
      - - A. kansuensis
        - A. ecalcarata
  - - - A. moorcroftiana
      - - - A. nivalis
          - - A. pubiflora
            - A. fragrans
        - A. lactiflora
        - - A. karelinii
          - A. atrovinosa
    - - A. olympica
      - - - A. einseleana
          - A. bertolonii
        - - - A. glandulosa
            - A. sibirica
            - - A. viridiflora
              - - A. buergeriana
                - A. oxysepala
          - - A. alpina
            - A. amaliae
            - A. atrata
            - A. aurea
            - A. barbaricina
            - A. bernardii
            - A. blecicii
            - A. champagnatii
            - A. dinarica
            - A. dumeticola
            - A. grata
            - A. iulia
            - A. litardierei
            - A. kitaibelii
            - A. magellensis
            - A. nigricans
            - A. nugorensis
            - A. nuragica
            - A. pancicii
            - A. pyrenaica
            - A. reuteri
            - A. transsilvanica
            - A. vestinae
            - A. viscosa
            - A. vulgaris

Phylogeny of the genus Aquilegia, based on Fior et al. 2013. Some names used by that study are now considered synonyms; the names accepted by Plants of the World Online for those taxa are used here.

- Aquilegia alpina L. – alpine columbine
- Aquilegia amaliae Heldr. ex Boiss. - Amalia's columbine
- Aquilegia apuana (Marchetti) E.Nardi
- Aquilegia aradanica Shaulo & Erst
- Aquilegia aragonensis Willk.
- Aquilegia atrata W.D.J.Koch – dark columbine
- Aquilegia atrovinosa Popov ex Gamajun.
- Aquilegia atwoodii S.L.Welsh
- Aquilegia aurea Janka
- Aquilegia ballii (Litard. & Maire) E.Nardi
- Aquilegia baluchistanica Qureshi & Chaudhri
- Aquilegia barbaricina Arrigoni & E.Nardi – Barbaricina columbine
- Aquilegia barnebyi Munz – oil shale columbine
- Aquilegia barykinae Erst, Karakulov & Luferov
- Aquilegia bashahrica Erst
- Aquilegia bernardii Gren. & Godr. – Bernard's columbine
- Aquilegia bertolonii Schott – Bertoloni columbine
- Aquilegia blecicii Podobnik - Blečić's columbine
- Aquilegia borodinii Schischk.
- Aquilegia brevistyla Hook. – smallflower columbine
- Aquilegia buergeriana Siebold & Zucc.
- Aquilegia canadensis L. – Canadian columbine, wild columbine
- Aquilegia cazorlensis Heywood
- Aquilegia champagnatii Moraldo, E.Nardi & la Valva
- Aquilegia chaplinei Standl. ex Payson
- Aquilegia chitralensis Qureshi & Chaudhri
- Aquilegia chrysantha A.Gray – golden columbine
- Aquilegia coerulea E.James – Colorado blue columbine
- Aquilegia colchica Kem.-Nath.
- Aquilegia confusa Rota
- Aquilegia cossoniana (Maire & Sennen) Rivas Mart.
- Aquilegia × cottia Beyer
- Aquilegia cremnophila Bacch., Brullo, Congiu, Fenu, J.L.Garrido & Mattana
- Aquilegia cymosa Qureshi & Chaudhri
- Aquilegia daingolica Erst & Shaulo
- Aquilegia desertorum (M.E.Jones) Cockerell ex A.Heller – desert columbine
- Aquilegia desolaticola S.L.Welsh & N.D.Atwood – desolation columbine, Desolation Canyon columbine
- Aquilegia dichroa Freyn
- Aquilegia dinarica Beck - Dinaric columbine
- Aquilegia discolor Levier & Leresche
- Aquilegia dumeticola Jord.
- Aquilegia ecalcarata Maxim. – spurless columbine, false columbine
- Aquilegia einseleana F.W.Schultz – Einsele's columbine
- Aquilegia elegantula Greene – western red columbine
- Aquilegia × emodi Erst
- Aquilegia eximia Van Houtte ex Planch. – Van Houtte's columbine
- Aquilegia flabellata Siebold & Zucc. – fan columbine, Japanese wodamakinari (including A. akitensis)
- Aquilegia flavescens S.Watson – yellow columbine
- Aquilegia formosa Fisch. ex DC. – crimson columbine, western columbine
  - Aquilegia formosa var. truncata (Fisch. & C.A.Mey.) Baker – red columbine, western columbine
- Aquilegia fosteri (S.L.Welsh) S.L.Welsh
- Aquilegia fragrans Benth. – fragrant columbine
- Aquilegia ganboldii Kamelin & Gubanov
- Aquilegia gegica Jabr.-Kolak.
- Aquilegia glandulosa Fisch. ex Link. – Siberian columbine, Altai columbine
- Aquilegia gracillima Rech.f.
- Aquilegia grata Maly ex Zimmeter
- Aquilegia grubovii Erst, Luferov, Wei Wang & K.l.Xiang
- Aquilegia guarensis Losa
- Aquilegia hebeica Erst
- Aquilegia hinckleyana Munz
- Aquilegia hirsutissima Timb.-Lagr. ex Gariod
- Aquilegia hispanica (Willk.) Borbás
- Aquilegia holmgrenii S.L.Welsh & N.D.Atwood
- Aquilegia × hybrida Sims – hybrids of Aquilegia vulgaris and Aquilegia canadensis
- Aquilegia incurvata P.K.Hsiao - Qinling columbine
- Aquilegia iulia E.Nardi - Julian columbine
- Aquilegia jonesii Parry – Jones' columbine
- Aquilegia kamelinii Erst, Shaulo & Shmakov
- Aquilegia kanawarensis Jacquem. ex Cambess.
- Aquilegia kansuensis (Brühl) Erst
- Aquilegia karatavica Mikeschin
- Aquilegia karelinii (Baker) O.Fedtsch. & B.Fedtsch. - Afghan columbine
- Aquilegia kitaibelii Schott
- Aquilegia kozakii Masam.
- Aquilegia kubanica I.M.Vassiljeva
- Aquilegia lactiflora Kar. & Kir.
- Aquilegia laramiensis A.Nelson – Laramie columbine
- Aquilegia litardierei Briq.
- Aquilegia longissima – Gray. – longspur columbine, long-spurred columbine
- Aquilegia lucensis E.Nardi
- Aquilegia magellensis F.Conti & Soldano – Magella columbine
- Aquilegia maimanica Rech.f.
- Aquilegia marcelliana E.Nardi
- Aquilegia × maruyamana Kitam.
- Aquilegia meridionalis (Quézel & Contandr.) E.Nardi
- Aquilegia micrantha Eastw. – Mancos columbine, Bluff City columbine
  - Aquilegia micrantha var. grahamii (S.L.Welsh & Goodrich) N.H.Holmgren & P.K.Holmgren – Graham's columbine
  - Aquilegia micrantha var. loriae (S.L.Welsh & N.D.Atwood) N.H.Holmgren & P.K.Holmgren – Lori's columbine
  - Aquilegia micrantha var. mancosana Eastw.
- Aquilegia microcentra Rech.f.
- Aquilegia × miniana (J.F.Macbr. & Payson) Cronk
- Aquilegia montsicciana Font Quer
- Aquilegia moorcroftiana Wall. ex Royle
- Aquilegia nigricans Baumg. – Bulgarian columbine
- Aquilegia nikolicii Niketić & Cikovak
- Aquilegia nivalis (Falc. ex Brühl) J.R.Drumm. & Hutch.
- Aquilegia nugorensis Arrigoni & E.Nardi
- Aquilegia nuragica Arrigoni & E.Nardi – Nuragica columbine
- Aquilegia ochotensis Vorosch.
- Aquilegia × oenipontana A.Kern. ex Riedl
- Aquilegia olympica Boiss.
- Aquilegia ophiolithica Barberis & E.Nardi
- Aquilegia ottonis Orph. ex Boiss.
- Aquilegia oxysepala Trautv. & C.A.Mey.
- Aquilegia pancicii Degen
- Aquilegia parviflora Ledeb.
- Aquilegia paui Font Quer
- Aquilegia pubescens Coville – Sierra columbine, Coville's columbine
- Aquilegia pubiflora Wall. ex Royle
- Aquilegia pyrenaica DC. – Pyrenean columbine
- Aquilegia reuteri Boiss.
- Aquilegia rockii Munz
- Aquilegia saxifraga Casim.-Sor.Solanas & Cabezudo
- Aquilegia saximontana Rydb. – Rocky Mountain columbine
- Aquilegia scopulorum Tidestr. – blue columbine, Utah columbine
- Aquilegia shockleyi Eastw. – desert columbine
- Aquilegia sibirica Lam. – Siberian columbine
- Aquilegia sicula (Strobl) E.Nardi
- Aquilegia skinneri Hook.
- Aquilegia sternbergii Rchb.
- Aquilegia subscaposa Borbás
- Aquilegia synakensis Shaulo & Erst
- Aquilegia taygetea Orph.
- Aquilegia tianschanica Butkov
- Aquilegia transsilvanica Schur
- Aquilegia turczaninowii Kamelin & Gubanov
- Aquilegia tuvinica I.M.Vassiljeva
- Aquilegia ullepitschii Pax
- Aquilegia vicaria Nevski
- Aquilegia viridiflora Pall. – green columbine, green-flowered columbine
- Aquilegia viscosa Gouan
- Aquilegia vitalii Gamajun.
- Aquilegia vulgaris L. – common columbine, European columbine, granny's nightcap
  - Aquilegia vulgaris subsp. nevadensis (Boiss. & Reut.) T.E.Díaz
- Aquilegia wittmanniana Steven ex Fisch., C.A.Mey. & Avé-Lall.
- Aquilegia xinjiangensis Erst
- Aquilegia yabeana Kitag.
- Aquilegia yangii Y.Luo & Lu Li
- Aquilegia zapateri Pau
