= Aquilegia atrovinosa =

Scientific classification
- Kingdom: Plantae
- Clade: Tracheophytes
- Clade: Angiosperms
- Clade: Eudicots
- Order: Ranunculales
- Family: Ranunculaceae
- Genus: Aquilegia
- Species: A. atrovinosa

Binomial name
- Aquilegia atrovinosa Popov ex Gamajun.

Species of flowering plant

Aquilegia atrovinosa is a perennial species of flowering plant in the family Ranunculaceae native to Central Asia.

== Description ==
The flowers of this species are a dark purple colour, 3–3.5 cm (1.2–1.4 in) in diameter, with incurved spurs of around 1.5 cm (0.59 in) in length. The plant grows to between 30–60 cm (12–24 in), occasionally reaching 90 cm (35 in).

== Taxonomy ==
Aquilegia atrovinosa is most closely related to the so-called Afghan columbine Aquilegia karelinii, within a larger Central Asian clade also including Aquilegia moorcroftiana, Aquilegia nivalis, Aquilegia pubiflora, Aquilegia fragrans, and Aquilegia lactiflora.

=== Etymology ===
The specific epithet atrovinosa derives from the Latin words atro, meaning "dark", and vinosa, meaning "full of wine", probably referring to the colour of the flowers.

== Distribution and habitat ==
Aquilegia atrovinosa is native to primarily temperate regions of Tajikistan, Kazakhstan, Kyrgyzstan, and northern Xinjiang. It grows at altitudes of 1,800–3,600 m (5,900–11,800 ft) in forests and in montane river valleys.
