= Aquilegia montsicciana =

Scientific classification
- Kingdom: Plantae
- Clade: Tracheophytes
- Clade: Angiosperms
- Clade: Eudicots
- Order: Ranunculales
- Family: Ranunculaceae
- Genus: Aquilegia
- Species: A. montsicciana

Binomial name
- Aquilegia montsicciana Font Quer

Synonyms
- Aquilegia hirsutissima var. montsicciana (Font Quer) J.Pujadas; Aquilegia viscosa subsp. montsicciana (Font Quer) O.Bolòs & Vigo

Species of flowering plant

Aquilegia montsicciana is a perennial flowering plant of the genus Aquilegia (columbines) in the family Ranunculaceae, endemic to Spain.

== Description ==
Aquilegia montsicciana is a perennial herbaceous plant growing to 15–35 cm (6–14 in) in height with sticky stems which can be simple or branched. The leaves are ternate and deeply divided into unequal rounded lobes, light green in colour and hairy. The flowers are pale blue or white with pointed egg-shaped or lancehead-shaped sepals measuring 22 mm (0.9 in) long by 7 mm wide. The petals have nectar spurs which range from curved to tightly hooked and measure 16 mm (0.6 in) long, and rounded or square blades which measure 7–12.5 mm long by 6.5–8 mm wide. The stamens are smooth and shorter than the petals, and the anthers are yellow. The staminodes are pointed, and there are 3–5 follicles which are hairy and measure 14–19 mm (0.6–0.7 in) long. The styles are 8 mm in length.

== Taxonomy ==
Aquilegia montsicciana is most similar to Aquilegia kitaibelii, from which it differs in having simply ternate leaves, being less sticky, and having larger follicles. It is also close to Aquilegia aragonensis, differing in its hooked spurs, tripartite rather than trisect leaf segments, and larger flowers and spurs.

=== Taxonomic history ===
The type specimen was collected by the Catalan botanist Pius Font i Quer on 27 June 1916 in a limestone ravine called Barranc de la Pardina in the Montsec d'Ares mountains in the Province of Lleida, Catalonia, at an altitude of 1,200 m (3,900 ft). Font i Quer formally described the species in 1920. Although it has since been reassessed as a variety montsicciana of Aquilegia hirsutissima (Joan Pujadas i Ferrer, 1981) and a subspecies montsicciana of Aquilegia viscosa (Oriol de Bolòs and Josep Vigo Bonada, 1984; accepted by Flora Europaea), it is currently accepted as a distinct species by Plants of the World Online.

=== Etymology ===
The specific epithet montsicciana refers to the Montsec d'Ares mountains where the type specimen was collected.

== Distribution and habitat ==
Aquilegia montsicciana is endemic to the south-central and eastern Pyrenees, in northeastern Spain. It grows in rocky limestone habitats such as scree and ravines at altitudes from 900 m (3,000 ft) to 1,950 m (6,400 ft).

== Conservation ==
As of June 2025, the species has not been assessed for the IUCN Red List. It is protected by Catalan law (Decree 328/92) in the Montsec d'Ares area.
