= Aquilegia atwoodii =

Conservation status
- Critically Imperiled (NatureServe)

Scientific classification
- Kingdom: Plantae
- Clade: Tracheophytes
- Clade: Angiosperms
- Clade: Eudicots
- Order: Ranunculales
- Family: Ranunculaceae
- Genus: Aquilegia
- Species: A. atwoodii

Binomial name
- Aquilegia atwoodii S.L.Welsh

Species of flowering plant

Aquilegia atwoodii, commonly known as Atwood's columbine, is a perennial flowering plant in the family Ranunculaceae, endemic to Utah.

== Description ==
Aquilegia atwoodii is a perennial herb growing to 32 cm (13 in) in height. The stems, leaves and leaf stalks are glandular-pubescent, and the leaves are mostly basal and green in color. The leaf stalks are usually about 10–12 cm (3.9–4.7 in) long. The plant produces one or more flowers with horizontally spreading sepals and nectar spurs that are reddish to pink in color. The petal blades are yellow in color and shorter than the stamens.

== Taxonomy ==
The type specimen was collected on 7 May 1999 by the American botanist Nephi Duane Atwood (1938–2021). The species was formally described by Stanley L. Welsh in 2003.

The plant is similar to Aquilegia barnebyi, but differs in its green, thinner, and more glandular leaves. It has been considered as a synonym of Aquilegia fosteri, although Welsh considers this unlikely, citing differences in geology, habitat, and morphology.

=== Etymology ===
The specific epithet atwoodii honours N. D. Atwood, who collected the type specimen.

== Distribution and habitat ==
Aquilegia atwoodii is endemic to Desolation Canyon on the Green River in the Carbon and Uintah counties of eastern Utah. It inhabits springs and seep margins alongside copperweed and mixed shrubs.

== Conservation ==
As of November 2024, the species has not been assessed for the IUCN Red List, but is listed by NatureServe as Critically Imperiled (G1). This status was last reviewed on 29 May 2018.

The species is included in the Utah Native Plant Society's watch list for potential conservation attention.

== Ecology ==
Aquilegia atwoodii flowers from May to June.
