= Aquilegia (disambiguation) =

Aquilegia is the plant genus containing the columbines.

Aquilegia may also refer to:

- 1063 Aquilegia, a main belt asteroid
- Aquilegia, Italy

== Related ==
- List of Aquilegia species, comprising the approximately 130 species in the genus
