= Aquilegia holmgrenii =

Conservation status
- Critically Imperiled (NatureServe)

Scientific classification
- Kingdom: Plantae
- Clade: Tracheophytes
- Clade: Angiosperms
- Clade: Eudicots
- Order: Ranunculales
- Family: Ranunculaceae
- Genus: Aquilegia
- Species: A. holmgrenii

Binomial name
- Aquilegia holmgrenii S.L.Welsh & N.D.Atwood

Species of flowering plant native to the US

Aquilegia holmgrenii, common name Noel's columbine, is a perennial flowering plant in the family Ranunculaceae, endemic to Utah.

== Description ==
Aquilegia holmgrenii is a perennial herbaceous plant growing to 15–27 cm (5.9–10.6 in) tall. The stems are smooth towards the base and glandular-puberulent (downy) in the upper part. The leaves are mainly basal, 4–25 cm (1.6–9.8 in) long (rarely up to 30 cm (12 in)) and biternate, with stalks 1.5–9 cm (0.59–3.54 in) long and grey-green leaflets that are smooth underneath. The plant produces one or a few flowers which are long and cone-shaped, with scarlet, pointed, egg-shaped sepals 7–15 mm long. The petals are 10–11 mm long and yellow, with dull scarlet nectar spurs 3–4 cm (1.2–1.6 in) in length. The stamens exceed the length of the petals by 4–8 mm.

== Taxonomy ==
Aquilegia holmgrenii was formally described by Stanley L. Welsh and N. Duane Atwood in 2008, from a type specimen and paratype both collected in a wash east of Escalante in Garfield County, Utah, by the American botanist Walter Pace Cottam (1894–1988) on 18 June 1929, and a further paratype collected by Atwood at Skull Springs, north of Escalante, on 15 June 1965. The species was previously treated as Aquilegia elegantula.

=== Etymology ===
The specific epithet holmgrenii and the common name Noel's columbine both honour the American botanist Noel Holmgren, who drew attention to the plant from annotations found at Brigham Young University.

== Distribution and habitat ==
Aquilegia holmgrenii is endemic to Garfield County, Utah, inhabiting moist woods in the arid, rocky terrain around Escalante.

== Conservation ==
As of January 2025, the species has not been assessed for the IUCN Red List, but was listed by NatureServe as Critically Imperiled (G1). This status was last reviewed on 29 May 2018.
