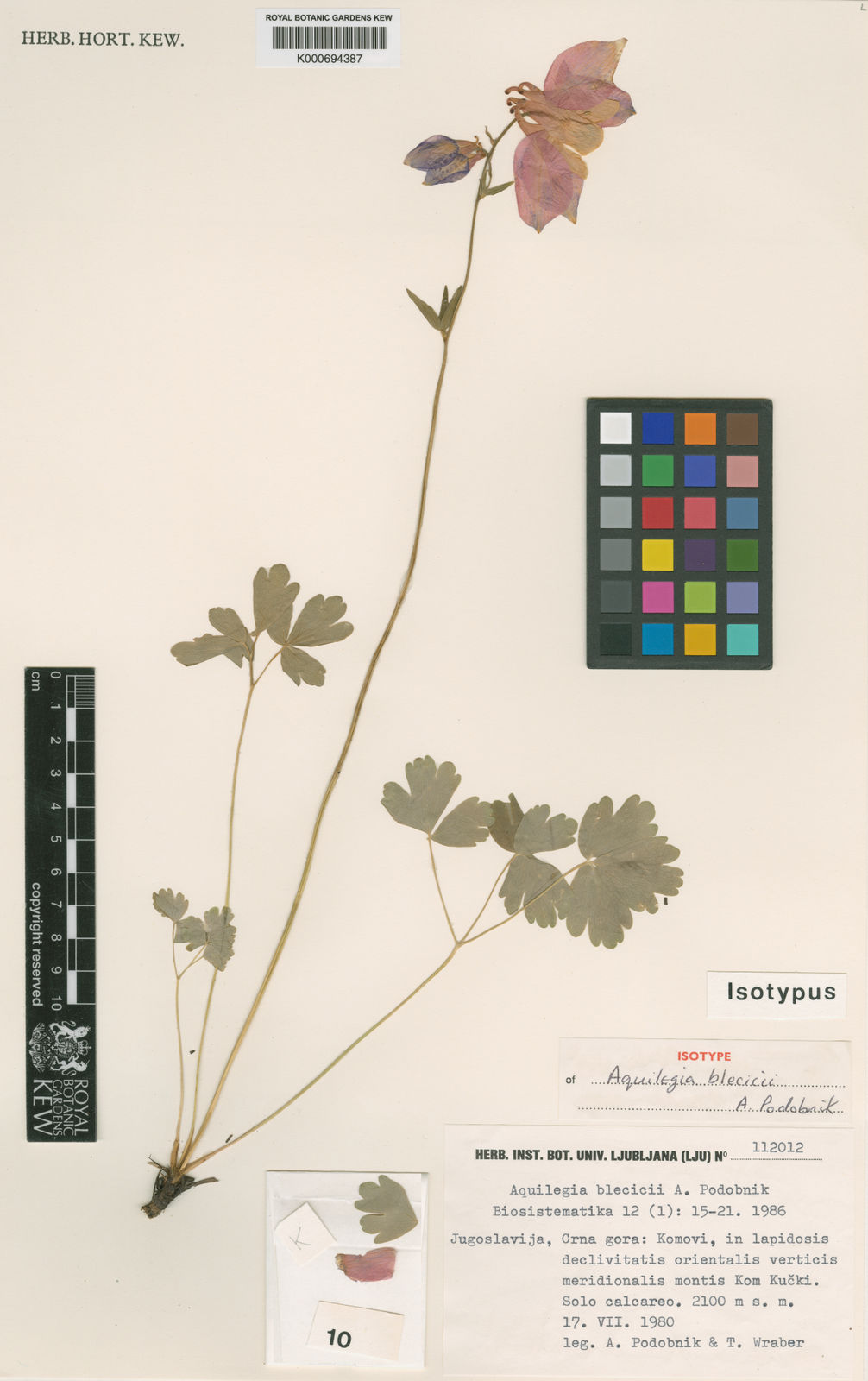
- Isotype specimen of Aquilegia blecicii in Kew Herbarium

Conservation status
- Data Deficient (IUCN 3.1)

Scientific classification
- Kingdom: Plantae
- Clade: Tracheophytes
- Clade: Angiosperms
- Clade: Eudicots
- Order: Ranunculales
- Family: Ranunculaceae
- Genus: Aquilegia
- Species: A. blecicii

Binomial name
- Aquilegia blecicii A.Podob.

= Aquilegia blecicii =

Species of flowering plant

Aquilegia blecicii, common name Blečić's columbine, is a perennial species of flowering plant in the family Ranunculaceae, native to the Balkans.

== Description ==
The species grows to 20–80 cm (8–31 in) tall. It has one or two hairy stems bearing 2–6 bicoloured white and pale blue to violet flowers measuring 50–90 mm (2.0–3.5 in) in diameter, with straight nectar spurs of 14–22 mm (0.6–0.9 in) in length, slightly curved at the end. The leaves are long, greyish and three-lobed, covered with soft hairs and measuring 20–40 mm (0.8–1.6 in) across.

== Taxonomy ==
The plant's status as a separate species from Aquilegia nigricans is considered doubtfully valid by some authorities.

=== Etymology ===
The specific name blecicii honours the Montenegrin botanist Vilotije Blečić (1911–1981).

== Distribution and habitat ==
The species is native to mountainous regions of Serbia, Kosovo, and Montenegro. It grows on humid mild limestone slopes ranging between the submontane and the subalpine belts, at altitudes of 1,600–2,200 m (5,200–7,200 ft).

== Ecology ==
Aquilegia blecicii plays an important role in its typical local plant community, which is dominated by herbaceous species such as the blue sow thistle Cicerbita pancicii, the herbaceous layer reaching 150–200 cm (59–79 in) in height and covering 95–100% of the ground. This plant community is found in areas with negligible human impact.

== Conservation ==
The species is rated as Data deficient in the IUCN Red List, but is nationally protected in Serbia and Kosovo.
