= Aquilegia marcelliana =

Scientific classification
- Kingdom: Plantae
- Clade: Tracheophytes
- Clade: Angiosperms
- Clade: Eudicots
- Order: Ranunculales
- Family: Ranunculaceae
- Genus: Aquilegia
- Species: A. marcelliana

Binomial name
- Aquilegia marcelliana E.Nardi

Species of flowering plant

Aquilegia marcelliana is a perennial flowering plant in the family Ranunculaceae, endemic to Italy.

== Description ==
Aquilegia marcelliana is a perennial herbaceous plant with sticky, hairy, leafy stems. The leaves are hairy above and below, long-stalked, and ternate or biternate. The flowers are either solitary or form bract-like inflorescences of a few flowers, and are open, large (up to 70 mm (2.8 in) across), multicoloured, and very slightly hairy. The sepals are pointed or egg-shaped, longer than the petals, and variegated, intensely violet in the middle and purple at either end. The petals are lilac and up to 44 mm (1.7 in) long, with long, tubular, hooked nectar spurs. The stamens do not protrude beyond the petals, and form a spread-out shape. The anthers are yellow, the styles smooth towards the top, and the follicles are small at up to 15 mm (0.6 in) long.

== Taxonomy ==
The species is differentiated from Aquilegia champagnatii by its stickier leaves, variegated flowers, the corolla being cylindrical in its upper part, hooked and tubular nectar spurs, and deeply inserted stamens. From Aquilegia magellensis it differs in its multicoloured flowers, the corolla being cylindrical in its upper part, and the hooked and tubular nectar spurs. From Aquilegia ottonis it is differentiated by its stickier leaves, the corolla being cylindrical in its upper part, the deeply inserted stamens, and the hooked and tubular nectar spurs.

=== Taxonomic history ===
The type specimen was collected by the Italian botanists Enio Nardi, Marcello Tardelli, and Carlo Ricceri on 20 July 1980 on the north face of the mountain Panormo (also known as Alburno) in the Alburni, in the Campanian Apennines, at an altitude of 1,370 m (4,490 ft). The specimen was growing in limestone rocks at the base of a large valley.

=== Etymology ===
The specific epithet marcelliana was chosen by Enio Nardi to honour his friend and colleague Marcello Tardelli, with whom he collected the type specimen in 1980.

== Distribution and habitat ==
Aquilegia marcelliana is endemic to the Alburni mountains in Campania, part of the Apennines.

== Conservation ==
As of May 2025, the species has not been assessed for the IUCN Red List. In Italy, it is judged to have insufficient data available to assess its conservation status, with a rating of Data Deficient (DD).
