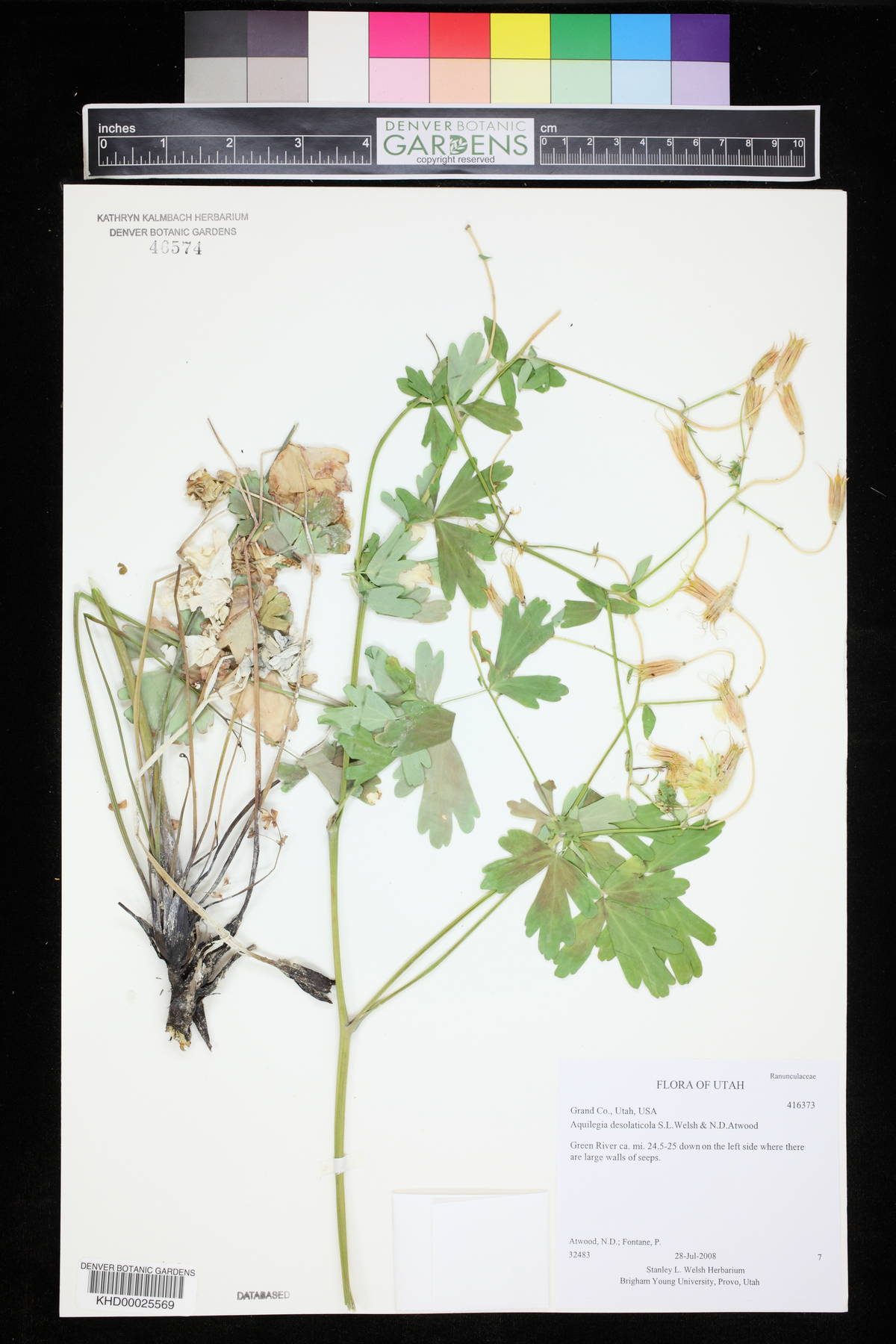
- Specimen collected in 2008

Conservation status
- Imperiled (NatureServe)

Scientific classification
- Kingdom: Plantae
- Clade: Tracheophytes
- Clade: Angiosperms
- Clade: Eudicots
- Order: Ranunculales
- Family: Ranunculaceae
- Genus: Aquilegia
- Species: A. desolaticola

Binomial name
- Aquilegia desolaticola S.L.Welsh & N.D.Atwood

= Aquilegia desolaticola =

Utahan species of columbine

Aquilegia desolaticola, the desolation columbine or Desolation Canyon columbine, is a perennial species of flowering plant in the family Ranunculaceae, endemic to Utah.

== Description ==
Aquilegia desolaticola grows to between 40 and 60 centimeters (1.3 and 2.0 ft) in height, with smooth or downy stems forming large clumps. The basal leaves are 15–35 cm (5.9–13.8 in) long, smooth, and biternate. The plant produces one or more nodding golden-yellow flowers which may have a bluish or pinkish tinge and measure 7–10 mm in length, with the stamens protruding by another 7–12 mm. The flower spurs are yellow and measure 2.5–3.5 cm (1.0–1.4 in).

== Taxonomy ==
Although closely resembling the golden columbine Aquilegia chrysantha, this species is probably most closely related to Aquilegia barnebyi. It is part of a clade containing all the North American species of columbines that likely split from their closest relatives in East Asia in the mid-Pliocene, approximately 3.84 million years ago.

=== Etymology ===
The specific epithet desolaticola is taken from the plant's habitat, Desolation Canyon.

== Distribution and habitat ==
Aquilegia desolaticola is endemic to Utah and only known from the remote Desolation Canyon on the Green River. It inhabits seeps and adjacent most sandy soils in the Peace River Formation at altitudes of 1,300–1,350 meters (4,300–4,400 ft).

== Conservation ==
As of November 2024, NatureServe listed Aquilegia desolaticola as Imperiled (G2). This status was last reviewed on 18 April 2019. NatureServe notes that its habitat is isolated from people and livestock, limiting the threat to the species.
