= Aquilegia meridionalis =

Scientific classification
- Kingdom: Plantae
- Clade: Tracheophytes
- Clade: Angiosperms
- Clade: Eudicots
- Order: Ranunculales
- Family: Ranunculaceae
- Genus: Aquilegia
- Species: A. meridionalis

Binomial name
- Aquilegia meridionalis (Quézel & Contandr.) E.Nardi
- Location of Mounts Giona and Parnassus in Greece, to which Aquilegia meridionalis is endemic

Synonyms
- Aquilegia amaliae subsp. meridionalis Quézel & Contandr.

Species of flowering plant native to Greece

Aquilegia meridionalis is a perennial flowering plant in the family Ranunculaceae, endemic to Greece.

== Description ==
Aquilegia meridionalis is a perennial herbaceous plant with bicoloured petals which are white or pale cream and rounded at the edge and bluish-violet at the top, with blue-violet nectar spurs and sepals. The stamens do not extend past the petals, and the follicles are 10–15 mm (0.4–0.6 in) in length.

== Taxonomy ==
=== Taxonomic history ===
The species was initially described as a subspecies meridionalis of Aquilegia amaliae by the French botanists Pierre Ambrunaz Quézel and Juliette Contandriopoulos in 1967. It was raised to the status of a species in its own right by the Italian botanist Enio Nardi in 2014. This assessment is accepted by Plants of the World Online, although Kit Tan et al in 2024 consider it a subspecies meridionalis of Aquilegia ottonis.

=== Etymology ===
The specific epithet meridionalis means "southern, midday, of noon, flowering at noon" in Latin. As Quézel and Contandriopoulos also proposed the epithet australis for the plant, the meaning "south" was presumably intended.

== Distribution and habitat ==
Aquilegia meridionalis is endemic to Mount Giona and Mount Parnassus in south-central Greece, growing on shady limestone cliffs at altitudes of 1,100–2,000 m (3,600–6,600 ft).

== Conservation ==
As of May 2025, the species has not been assessed for the IUCN Red List, although the populations on both Mount Giona and Mount Parnassus were described as "large" in 2024.

== Ecology ==
Aquilegia meridionalis flowers from June to early August.
