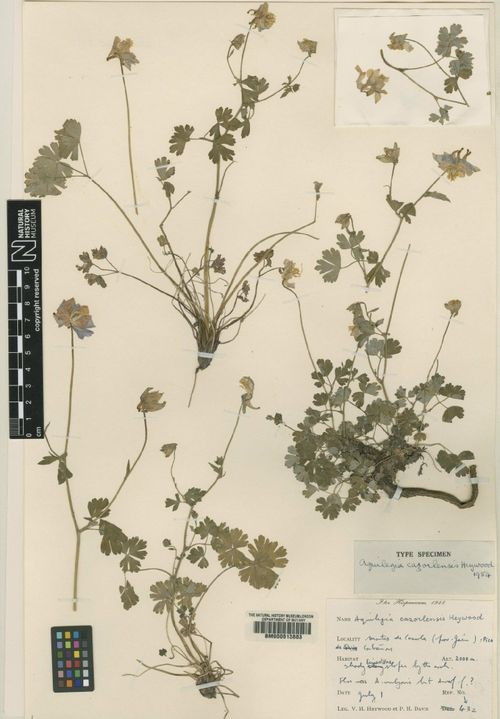
- Preserved specimen of Aquilegia cazorlensis in the Natural History Museum, London

Conservation status
- Endangered (IUCN 3.1)

Scientific classification
- Kingdom: Plantae
- Clade: Embryophytes
- Clade: Tracheophytes
- Clade: Spermatophytes
- Clade: Angiosperms
- Clade: Eudicots
- Order: Ranunculales
- Family: Ranunculaceae
- Genus: Aquilegia
- Species: A. cazorlensis

Binomial name
- Aquilegia cazorlensis Heywood

Synonyms
- Aquilegia pyrenaica subsp. cazorlensis (Heywood) Pereda & M.Laínz

= Aquilegia cazorlensis =

Species of flowering plant

Aquilegia cazorlensis is a perennial flowering plant in the family Ranunculaceae, endemic to southeastern Spain.

== Description ==
Aquilegia cazorlensis is a perennial herb growing to 15–25 cm (6–10 in) in height with branched, grooved stems which can be smooth or hairy. The basal leaves are biternate and have stalks measuring 4–10 cm (1.6–3.9 in) long. The plant produces one to three (rarely up to five) nodding blue flowers with egg-shaped, green-tipped sepals 10–16 mm (0.4–0.6 in) in length. The petals are egg-shaped and 8–9 mm long, with a broad, slightly incurved nectar spur of 6–7 mm length. The anthers are yellow and the stamens extend beyond the end of the petals.

== Taxonomy ==
The type specimen was collected by the British botanist Vernon Heywood on 1 July 1948 on Pico de Cabañas in the Sierra de Cazorla mountains, and formally described by him in 1954. Although reclassified as a subspecies cazorlensis of the closely related Aquilegia pyrenaica by the Spanish botanists José María Pereda and Manuel Laínz in 1967, A. cazorlensis is now accepted as a separate species in its own right.

=== Etymology ===
The specific epithet cazorlensis is taken from the Sierra de Cazorla to which the species is endemic.

== Distribution and habitat ==
Aquilegia cazorlensis is endemic to the Sierra de Cazorla in Andalusia, southern Spain. It grows in subalpine limestone screes at altitudes of 1,600–2,000 m (5,200–6,600 ft).

== Conservation ==
As of December 2024, the IUCN Red List listed Aquilegia cazorlensis as Endangered (EN) worldwide. This status was last reviewed on 1 March 2011, when the population was estimated to be stable at around 1,000 adult plants, all in protected areas. Its endangered status is due to its restricted distribution and threats from grazing by animals and trampling and disturbance by humans.

== Ecology ==
Aquilegia cazorlensis flowers from June to July.
