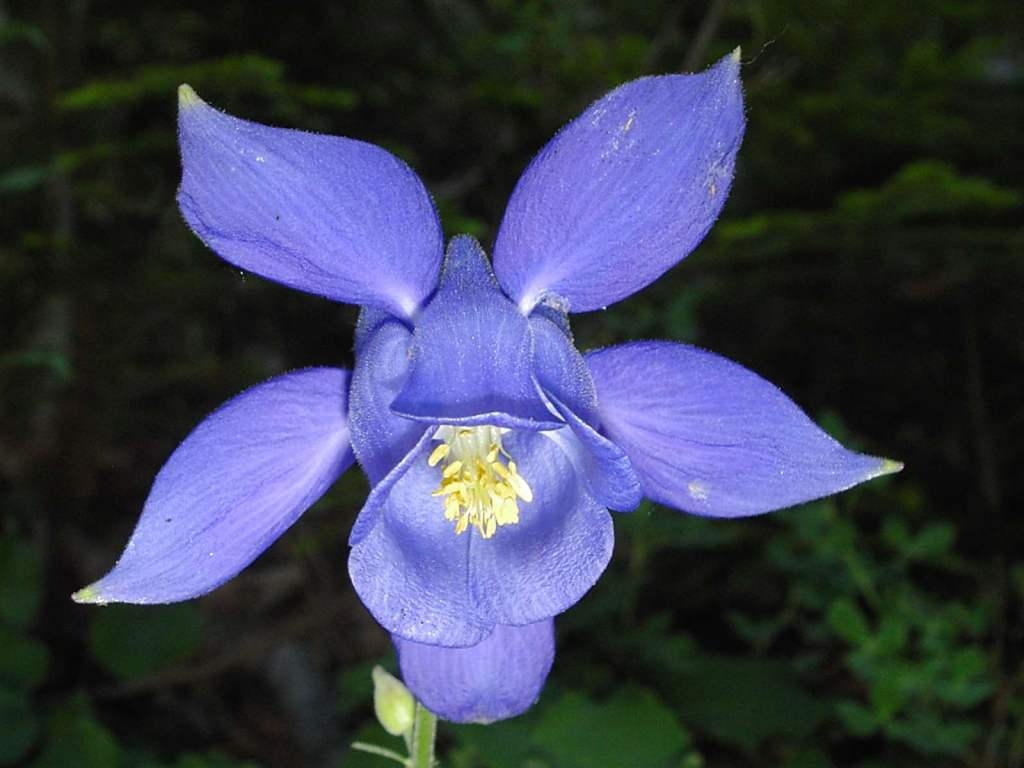
- A. bertolonii flower, Mont Ventoux, France

Conservation status
- Least Concern (IUCN 3.1)

Scientific classification
- Kingdom: Plantae
- Clade: Tracheophytes
- Clade: Angiosperms
- Clade: Eudicots
- Order: Ranunculales
- Family: Ranunculaceae
- Genus: Aquilegia
- Species: A. bertolonii

Binomial name
- Aquilegia bertolonii Schott

Synonyms
- List: Aquilegia bauhini subsp. bertolonii (Schott) Nyman; Aquilegia bauhinii subsp. bertolonii (Schott) Nyman; Aquilegia pyrenaica subsp. bertolonii (Schott) Munz; Aquilegia pyrenaica var. bertolonii (Schott) Fiori; Aquilegia vulgaris subsp. bertolonii (Schott) Brühl; Aquilegia pyrenaica Rchb. (nom. illeg.)

= Aquilegia bertolonii =

Species of flowering plant

Aquilegia bertolonii, common name Bertoloni columbine or Bertoloni's columbine, is a perennial species of flowering plant in the family Ranunculaceae, native to Italy, southern France, and Slovenia.

== Description ==
This is a dwarf species, growing to 30 cm (12 in) in height. In early summer each erect stem produces up to four spurred, blue-purple flowers.

== Taxonomy ==
Aquilegia bertolonii is most closely related to Aquilegia einseleana, Einsele's columbine from the Eastern Alps. The two species are estimated to have diverged from each other in the Pliocene around 1.23 million years ago, and form a sister clade to one containing the other European and some North and East Asian species of Aquilegia, from which they diverged approximately 2.5 million years ago.

=== Etymology ===
The specific name bertolonii honours the Italian botanist Antonio Bertoloni (1775–1869). When first describing this species, Heinrich Wilhelm Schott noted that Bertoloni had classified a specimen as Aquilegia pyrenaica, but Schott considered this specimen to be too different for the identification to hold, instead describing it as a new species with Bertoloni's name.

== Distribution and habitat ==
Aquilegia bertolonii is native to the northwestern Apennine Mountains in Italy, also being found in southern France and three disjunct areas in the Slovenian Alps. It grows on cliffs or limestone areas, steep slopes, rocky areas, stabilised screes and woodlands.

== Conservation ==
Although listed as a Least Concern species overall by the IUCN Red List, Aquilegia bertolonii is protected by national legislation in France and by regional legislation in Italy, and is listed as Vulnerable in Italy and Rare in Slovenia.

== Cultivation ==
In cultivation this dwarf columbine is a useful subject for the rockery or alpine garden. It has gained the Royal Horticultural Society's Award of Garden Merit.
