= Aquilegia baluchistanica =

Scientific classification
- Kingdom: Plantae
- Clade: Tracheophytes
- Clade: Angiosperms
- Clade: Eudicots
- Order: Ranunculales
- Family: Ranunculaceae
- Genus: Aquilegia
- Species: A. baluchistanica

Binomial name
- Aquilegia baluchistanica Qureshi & Chaudhri

Species of flowering plant

Aquilegia baluchistanica is a perennial flowering plant in the family Ranunculaceae, endemic to Pakistan. It has pink flowers.

== Description ==
Aquilegia baluchistanica is a perennial herb growing to 15–40 cm (5.9–15.7 in) tall. It has pubescent stems and green, biternate basal leaves. The flowers may be solitary, with pale pink petals and hooked nectar spurs. Its nectar spurs are between 15 millimetres (0.59 in) and 25 millimetres (0.98 in). Stems possess between one and six flowers.

== Taxonomy ==
The species was described in 1979 by the Pakistani botanists Rizwana Aleem Qureshi (born 1950) and Mohammad Nazeer Chaudhri (1932–2010). The type specimen was collected in Baluchistan on a date recorded as 25 May 1979, although this is likely erroneous as that would be after the formal description of the species from that specimen. The species was described from this sole specimen.

Aquilegia baluchistanica is one of three Pakistani Aquilegia species described as possessing affinities with Aquilegia pubiflora, with the others being Aquilegia chitralensis and Aquilegia kurramensis. A. baluchistanica is particularly similar to A. chitralensis, differing in number of flowers on each stem and in nectar spur length.

== Distribution and habitat ==
Aquilegia baluchistanica is endemic to Baluchistan in Pakistan, known from Sibi District. It grows in shady rocky areas.

== Conservation ==
As of November 2024, the species has not been assessed for the IUCN Red List.

== Ecology ==
Aquilegia baluchistanica flowers in spring and early summer.
