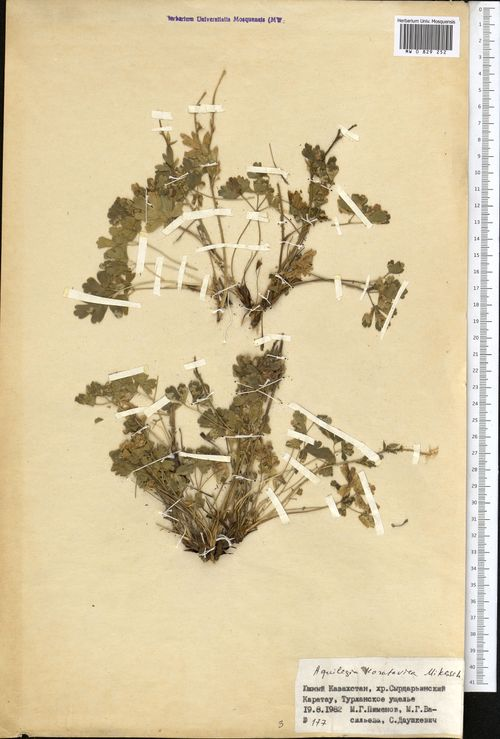
- Preserved Aquilegia karatavica specimen

Scientific classification
- Kingdom: Plantae
- Clade: Tracheophytes
- Clade: Angiosperms
- Clade: Eudicots
- Order: Ranunculales
- Family: Ranunculaceae
- Genus: Aquilegia
- Species: A. karatavica

Binomial name
- Aquilegia karatavica Mikeschin

= Aquilegia karatavica =

Kazakh species of columbine

Aquilegia karatavica is a perennial species of plant in the family Ranunculaceae, endemic to Kazakhstan.

== Description ==
The species is 15–20 cm (5.9–7.9 in) tall, occasionally up to 30 cm (12 in), with fragrant blue petals.

== Taxonomy ==
Aquilegia karatavica was described by the Soviet botanist Georgij Vladimirovic Mikeschin (1911–1965) in 1947, from the type specimen which he collected in 1936 and is now held in Moscow State University.

=== Etymology ===
The specific epithet karatavica refers to the Karatau Mountains to which the species is native.

== Distribution and habitat ==
Aquilegia karatavica is endemic to the Karatau Mountains of southern Kazakhstan, on north-facing rocky slopes at altitudes of around 1,300 m (4,300 ft).

== Conservation ==
The species has not been assessed for the IUCN Red List. Although the Karatau Nature Reserve covers part of the mountain ridge on which it grows, the reserve does not extend to the northern slope, which is the only known habitat of Aquilegia karatavica.
