= Aquilegia kozakii =

Scientific classification
- Kingdom: Plantae
- Clade: Tracheophytes
- Clade: Angiosperms
- Clade: Eudicots
- Order: Ranunculales
- Family: Ranunculaceae
- Genus: Aquilegia
- Species: A. kozakii

Binomial name
- Aquilegia kozakii Masam.
- Location of Taiping Mountain, Taiwan, to which Aquilegia kozakii is endemic

Species of flowering plant native to Taiwan

Aquilegia kozakii is a perennial flowering plant in the family Ranunculaceae, endemic to Taiwan.

== Taxonomy ==
=== Taxonomic history ===
The species was described in 1932 by the Japanese botanist Genkei Masamune, from a specimen collected on Taiping Mountain in Taiwan. As of 2008 the location of the type specimen was unknown and further specimens of the plant were required for study as very little information is available about the species and its status.

=== Etymology ===
The specific epithet kozakii comes from the name of Mr. Kozaki, who collected the type specimen from which the species was described.

== Distribution and habitat ==
Aquilegia kozakii is endemic to Taiping Mountain in northeastern Taiwan.

== Conservation ==
As of May 2025, the species has not been assessed for the IUCN Red List.
