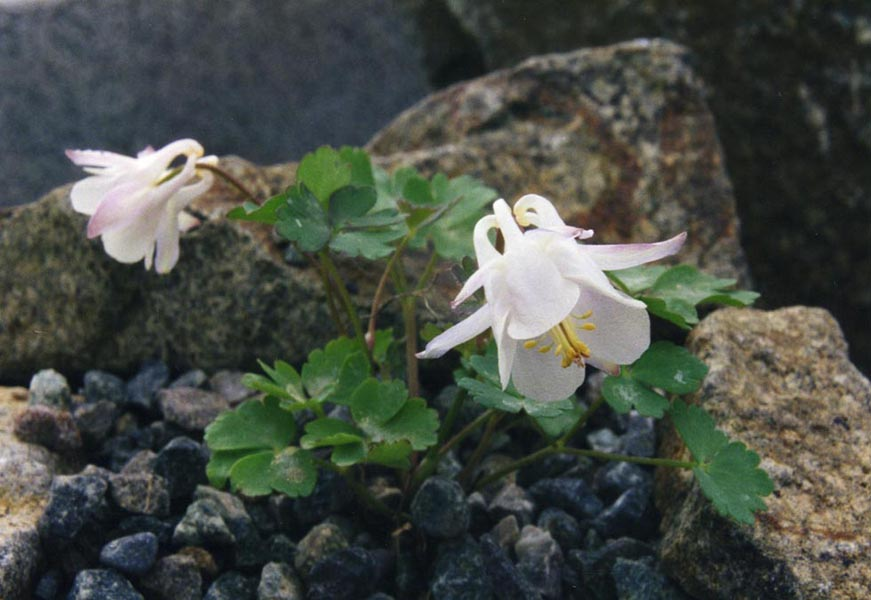

Conservation status
- Imperiled (NatureServe)

Scientific classification
- Kingdom: Plantae
- Clade: Embryophytes
- Clade: Tracheophytes
- Clade: Angiosperms
- Clade: Eudicots
- Order: Ranunculales
- Family: Ranunculaceae
- Genus: Aquilegia
- Species: A. laramiensis

Binomial name
- Aquilegia laramiensis A.Nelson

= Aquilegia laramiensis =

Species of flowering plant native to the US

Aquilegia laramiensis is a species of flowering plant in the buttercup family known by the common name Laramie columbine. It is endemic to Wyoming in the United States, where it is known only from the Laramie Mountains.

This rhizomatous perennial herb produces stems up to 25 centimeters (9.8 in) long. The leaves are compound, divided into leaflets. The nodding flowers have greenish white or lavender sepals up to 1.5 centimeters (0.59 in) in length. The cream-colored to lavender petals are up to 1.2 centimeters (0.47 in) long and have thick, hooked spurs. The fruit is a follicle up to 1.4 centimeters (0.55 in) long.

This plant is limited to one mountain range in Albany and Converse Counties in Wyoming. Many occurrences are within Medicine Bow National Forest, and the others are on land managed by the Bureau of Land Management and on privately owned land. Occurrences are small, most containing fewer than 100 individuals.

The plant grows on large rock outcrops in pockets of soil and rock cracks. The outcrops are surrounded by forest habitat and sometimes sagebrush and grassland. It grows in shady spots in all aspects. Associated species include fragile fern (Cystopteris fragilis), little-flowered alumroot (Heuchera parvifolia), glandular oceanspray (Holodiscus dumosus), mountain ninebark (Physocarpus monogynus), Brandegee's Jacob's ladder (Polemonium brandegeei), bigflower cinquefoil (Drymocallis fissa), red raspberry (Rubus idaeus), Idaho ragwort (Senecio rapifolius), and Rocky Mountain woodsia (Physematium scopulinum).

There are no major threats to the species because it occurs in remote, rugged habitat.
