= Aquilegia cymosa =

Scientific classification
- Kingdom: Plantae
- Clade: Tracheophytes
- Clade: Angiosperms
- Clade: Eudicots
- Order: Ranunculales
- Family: Ranunculaceae
- Genus: Aquilegia
- Species: A. cymosa

Binomial name
- Aquilegia cymosa Qureshi & Chaudhri

Pakistani species of columbine

Aquilegia cymosa is a perennial flowering plant in the family Ranunculaceae, endemic to Pakistan.

== Description ==
Aquilegia cymosa is a perennial herb growing to 15–35 cm (5.9–13.8 in) tall. It has hairy stems and smooth, biternate basal leaves. It produces two or sometimes more red or blue-purple flowers, with pointed sepals measuring 7–12 mm and nectar spurs 4–7 mm in length.

== Taxonomy ==
The species was described in 1978 (published 1979) by the Pakistani botanists Rizwana Aleem Qureshi (born 1950) and Mohammad Nazeer Chaudhri (1932–2010). It may be identical to Aquilegia pubiflora var. mussooriensis, as the descriptions differ only in the length of the petals.

=== Etymology ===
The specific epithet cymosa means "having flowers borne in a cyme".

== Distribution and habitat ==
Aquilegia cymosa is endemic to Pakistan, growing in sunny rock crevices at altitudes of 2,000–2,700 m (6,600–8,900 ft).

== Conservation ==
As of December 2024, the species has not been assessed for the IUCN Red List.

== Ecology ==
Aquilegia cymosa flowers in early summer.
