= Aquilegia aragonensis =

Scientific classification
- Kingdom: Plantae
- Clade: Tracheophytes
- Clade: Angiosperms
- Clade: Eudicots
- Order: Ranunculales
- Family: Ranunculaceae
- Genus: Aquilegia
- Species: A. aragonensis

Binomial name
- Aquilegia aragonensis Willk.

Synonyms
- Aquilegia discolor var. aragonensis (Willk.) Gürke; Aquilegia pyrenaica f. aragonensis (Willk.) Willk.

Species of flowering plant native to Spain

Aquilegia aragonensis is a perennial flowering plant in the family Ranunculaceae, endemic to northern Spain.

== Description ==
Aquilegia aragonensis is a small species, growing to around 5 in (130 mm) in height. The stems bear a single flower and are densely pubescent, as are the leaf stalks. The leaves themselves are small and ternate. The flowers are violet-blue with protruding stamens and vivid yellow anthers, the sepals having a greenish tip and the petals a straight or slightly curved nectar spur. The flower measures around 0.75 in (19 mm) in diameter.

== Taxonomy ==
Aquilegia aragonensis is part of the Aquilegia viscosa species complex, although the differences in the petals and leaves are sufficient to classify it as a separate species from A. viscosa itself. Aquilegia guarensis has been considered a synonym of this species by some authorities, but is generally accepted as a separate species.

The type specimen was collected by a man named Souberville on 1 August 1877 in the Pyrenees, north of Torla-Ordesa, and was described by Heinrich Moritz Willkomm in 1880 from a single plant. Willkomm noted its similarity to Aquilegia pyrenaica, the species differing in the structure of the leaves and petals.

=== Etymology ===
The specific epithet aragonensis is taken from the autonomous community of Aragon, to which the species is endemic.

== Distribution and habitat ==
Aquilegia aragonensis is endemic to the Pyrenees, in a few locations in the Province of Huesca in Aragon, northeastern Spain. It grows in the subalpine zone at altitudes between 1,400 to 1,900 m (4,600 to 6,200 ft). The plant colonizes dry limestone screes in places with a continental climate, warm and dry in summer but cold and sparsely covered with snow in winter. In the southern part of its range it grows in shaded locations, but in the north in more exposed sites.

== Conservation ==
As of November 2024, the species has not been assessed for the IUCN Red List.
