= Aquilegia apuana =

Scientific classification
- Kingdom: Plantae
- Clade: Tracheophytes
- Clade: Angiosperms
- Clade: Eudicots
- Order: Ranunculales
- Family: Ranunculaceae
- Genus: Aquilegia
- Species: A. apuana

Binomial name
- Aquilegia apuana (Marchetti) E.Nardi

Synonyms
- Aquilegia viscosa subsp. apuana Marchetti

Species of flowering plant native to Italy

Aquilegia apuana is a perennial flowering plant in the family Ranunculaceae, endemic to central Italy.

== Description ==
Aquilegia apuana is a perennial herb growing to 48 cm (19 in) high, covered with glandular hairs 0.2–0.4 mm long. The stem is erect, 2 mm wide at the base, covered with sheaths of old leaves, and sometimes branched towards the top. The basal leaves are very sticky and greyish or pale blue-green in colour, with stalks up to 20.5 cm (8.1 in) long. The plant produces up to six nodding, blue-purple flowers with petals that are whitish towards the base and a very curved (but not hooked) nectar spur measuring around 37 mm (1.5 in).

== Taxonomy ==
The species was originally described by Dino Marchetti in 2012 as a subspecies of Aquilegia viscosa, most closely related to the French subspecies viscosa. Its status was reassessed in 2014 by Enio Nardi as a species in its own right.

=== Etymology ===
The specific epithet apuana is taken from the Apuan Alps to which the species is native.

== Distribution and habitat ==
Aquilegia apuana is native to the Apuan Alps in northern Tuscany, Italy. Populations in the Orrida di Botri canyon in Tuscany and the Abruzzo, Lazio and Molise National Park in central Italy are also provisionally treated as A. apuana, pending further study as they are morphologically different from the population in the Apuan Alps.

The plant grows in soil and cracks at the base of overhanging limestone cliffs in protected positions such as cavities and cave mouths. It prefers dim light and sites with damp conditions or where there is seasonal dripping water.

== Conservation ==
As of November 2024, the species has not been assessed for the IUCN Red List. Its status is currently classified as Least Concern in Italy.
