= Aquilegia kanawarensis =

Scientific classification
- Kingdom: Plantae
- Clade: Tracheophytes
- Clade: Angiosperms
- Clade: Eudicots
- Order: Ranunculales
- Family: Ranunculaceae
- Genus: Aquilegia
- Species: A. kanawarensis

Binomial name
- Aquilegia kanawarensis Jacquem. ex Cambess.

Synonyms
- Aquilegia fragrans var. kanawarensis (Jacquem. ex Cambess.) Riedl; Aquilegia vulgaris var. kanawarensis (Jacquem. ex Cambess.) Brühl; Aquilegia baltistanica Qureshi & Chaudhri; Aquilegia nakaoi Tamura

Species of flowering plant

Aquilegia kanawarensis is a perennial flowering plant in the family Ranunculaceae, native to northern Pakistan and the Western Himalayas.

== Description ==
Aquilegia kanawarensis is a perennial herbaceous plant with a thick, branched root and a short, erect stem covered in glandular-pubescent hairs. The leaves are biternate or triternate (i.e. having three segments, each of which is biternate) and pubescent on both sides, with long stalks. The flowers are nodding and have oblong, downy, pale violet sepals. The petals are shorter than the sepals, egg-shaped, and pale yellow-white or ochre-white in colour, with straight nectar spurs. The stamens are shorter than the petals, and the anthers are oblong.

== Taxonomy ==
Aquilegia kanawarensis was formally described by the French botanist Jacques Cambessèdes in 1841 from an initial description made by his compatriot Victor Jacquemont, who collected the type specimen from a rock fissure at around 3,500 m (11,500 ft) altitude in Kinnaur district in Himachal Pradesh, and additional specimens from the Gombour estate on the Kashmiri border with Tibet.

=== Etymology ===
The specific epithet kanawarensis means "of or from Kinnaur" (spelt Kanaor in the original species description), referring to the district where the species was first found.

== Distribution and habitat ==
Aquilegia kanawarensis is native to the subalpine zone of the Western Himalayas in Pakistan and India. It grows in rock fissures and humid grassy areas at elevations around 3,000–3,500 m (9,800–11,500 ft).

== Conservation ==
As of February 2025, the species has not been assessed for the IUCN Red List.

== Ecology ==
Aquilegia kanawarensis flowers in August.

== Uses ==
In the Theeing and Parishing valleys of Astore District in Pakistan-administered Gilgit-Baltistan, Aquilegia kanawarensis is known as shash and valued as an ornamental plant. It is also used medicinally in these areas as a decoction to induce perspiration, promote urination, treat urinary tract infections, combat parasites, and as an astringent and a purifying agent.
