= Aquilegia × cottia =

Scientific classification
- Kingdom: Plantae
- Clade: Tracheophytes
- Clade: Angiosperms
- Clade: Eudicots
- Order: Ranunculales
- Family: Ranunculaceae
- Genus: Aquilegia
- Species: A. × cottia

Binomial name
- Aquilegia × cottia Beyer

Alpine natural hybrid columbine

Aquilegia × cottia is a perennial flowering plant in the family Ranunculaceae, native to the Alps of Italy and Austria. It is a natural hybrid of Aquilegia alpina and Aquilegia atrata.

== Description ==
Aquilegia × cottia is intermediate in form between its parent species A. alpina and A. atrata. Its leaves are blue-green underneath as in A. atrata, but more numerous and with more deeply notched tips. It has light purple-brown flowers with hooked nectar spurs, rounded at the end as in A. alpina rather than cut off almost straight like A. atrata. The anthers are yellow and almost as long as the petals.

== Taxonomy ==
Aquilegia × cottia was formally described in 1912 (published 1913) by the German botanist Rudolf Beyer, from specimens taken by the Italian botanist Edouard Rostan from the "Waldensian valleys" (the valleys of the Germanasca and Pellice rivers, known as a refuge for the Waldensians from the 12th century onwards) in the Cottian Alps in northwest Italy. Beyer noted that natural hybrids of Aquilegia were rare as it was very unusual for multiple species to grow near each other, but in this case adjacent populations of A. alpina and A. atrata had naturally hybridised. Rostan initially named the plant Aquilegia alpino-atrata after its parent species.

=== Etymology ===
The specific epithet cottia is taken from the Cottian Alps where the species was first discovered.

== Distribution and habitat ==
Aquilegia × cottia is native to the Alps of Italy and Austria.

== Conservation ==
As of December 2024, the species has not been assessed for the IUCN Red List.
