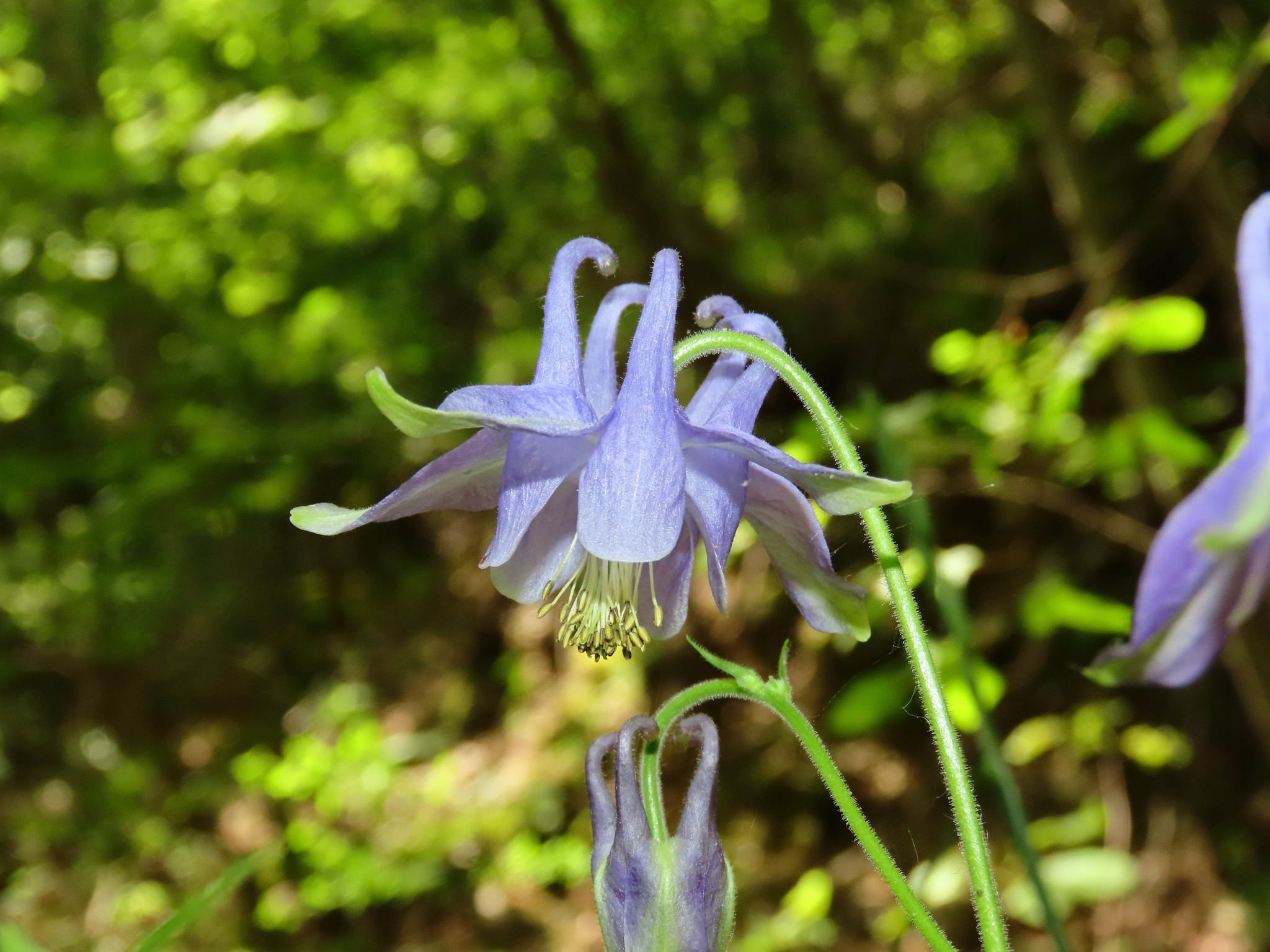
- Flower

Scientific classification
- Kingdom: Plantae
- Clade: Tracheophytes
- Clade: Angiosperms
- Clade: Eudicots
- Order: Ranunculales
- Family: Ranunculaceae
- Genus: Aquilegia
- Species: A. dumeticola

Binomial name
- Aquilegia dumeticola Jord.

Synonyms
- List: Aquilegia vulgaris subsp. dumeticola (Jord.) Nyman; Aquilegia vulgaris proles dumeticola (Jord.) Rouy; Aquilegia vulgaris var. dumeticola (Jord.) Gürke; Aquilegia vulgaris proles dumeticola (Jord.) Rouy & Foucaud; Aquilegia atrata var. viscidula Huter; Aquilegia huteri Borbás; Aquilegia vulgaris var. huteri Fiori; Aquilegia vulgaris f. incisa Beck

= Aquilegia dumeticola =

Southwestern European columbine species

Aquilegia dumeticola is a perennial flowering plant in the family Ranunculaceae, native to southeastern Europe.

== Description ==
Aquilegia dumeticola is a perennial herbaceous plant growing to 70 cm (28 in) in height. It forms clusters with erect, glandular-pubescent stems. The leaves are light green, biternate, and have rounded wedge- or fan-shaped leaflets. The plant produces pale violet flowers with narrow, pointed sepals 25 mm (1 in) in length and 12 mm (0.5 in) wide, and petals with a rounded nectar spur. The stamens protrude past the petals.

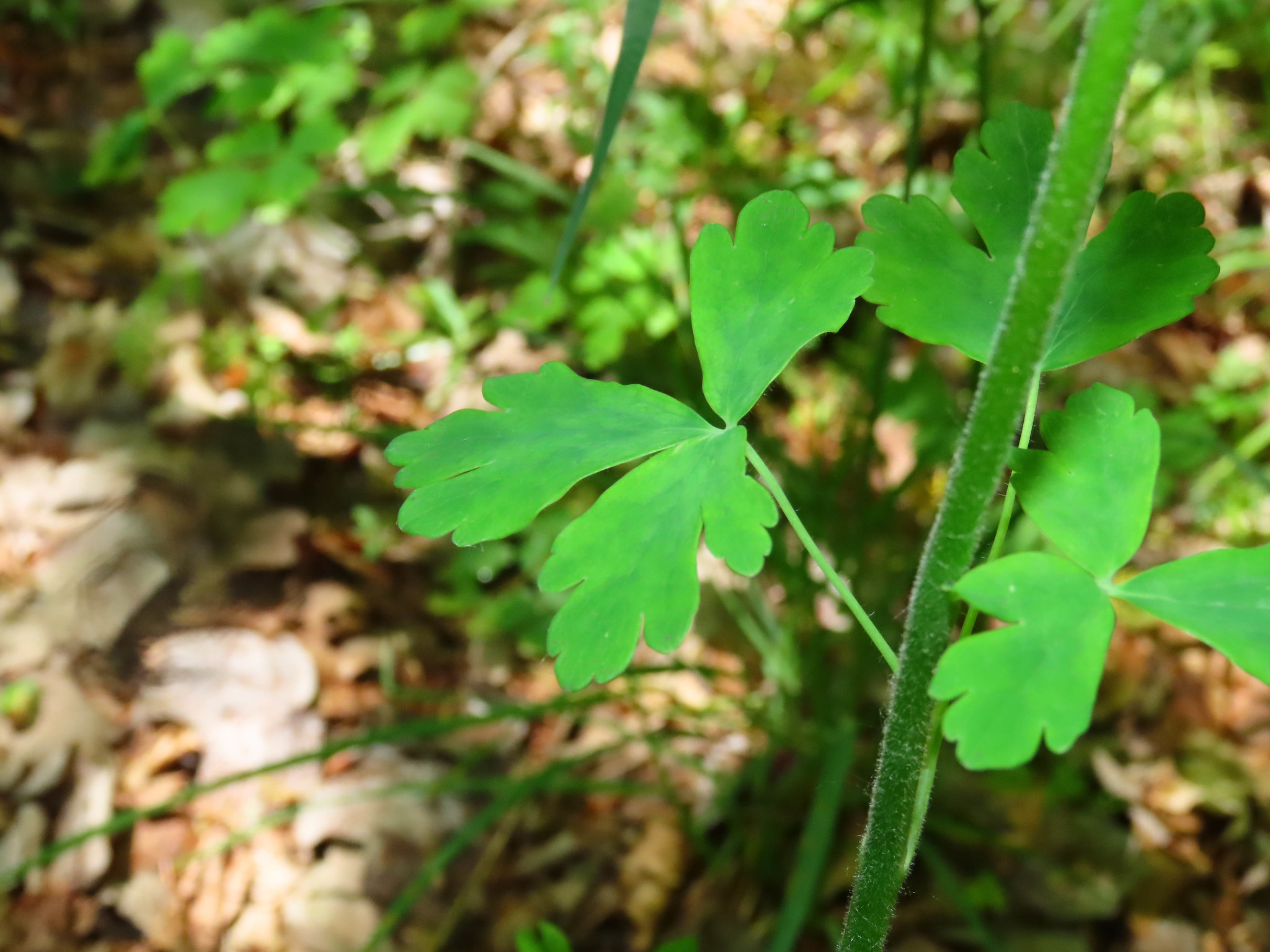
Leaves

== Taxonomy ==
The species was formally described by the French botanist Alexis Jordan in 1861, from a specimen collected in Corsica by D. Revelière. Jordan had a reputation for differentiating species too finely, and some authorities consider A. dumeticola to be a subspecies of Aquilegia vulgaris.

It belongs to a clade containing most of the European columbine species, which appear to have diverged from their closest relatives in Asia in the early Pleistocene, a little over 2 million years ago.

=== Etymology ===
The specific epithet dumeticola means "inhabiting thickets", from Latin dumetum "thicket" and -cola "inhabiting", referring to the plant's habitat.

== Distribution and habitat ==
Aquilegia dumeticola is native to Italy, Greece, Bosnia-Herzegovina, and Montenegro, and possibly also Albania, North Macedonia, Serbia, and Kosovo. It has been introduced to Corsica. In Italy it is native to almost all the mainland apart from the far north, and is not found in Sardinia or Sicily. It grows in scrub and forest habitats.

== Conservation ==
As of December 2024, the species has not been assessed for the IUCN Red List.

== Ecology ==
Aquilegia dumeticola flowers from April to June.
