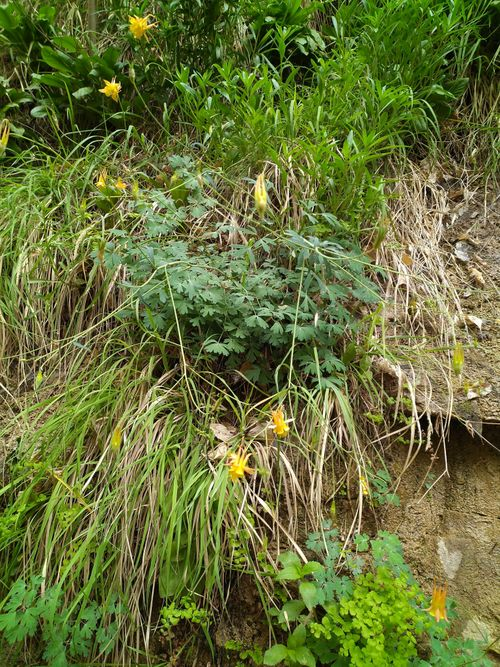
- Aquilegia fosteri plants in Zion National Park, Utah

Scientific classification
- Kingdom: Plantae
- Clade: Tracheophytes
- Clade: Angiosperms
- Clade: Eudicots
- Order: Ranunculales
- Family: Ranunculaceae
- Genus: Aquilegia
- Species: A. fosteri

Binomial name
- Aquilegia fosteri S.L.Welsh

Synonyms
- Aquilegia formosa var. fosteri S.L.Welsh

= Aquilegia fosteri =

Species of flowering plant native to the US

Aquilegia fosteri, common name Foster's columbine, is a perennial flowering plant in the family Ranunculaceae, native to Utah and Arizona.

== Description ==
Aquilegia fosteri is a perennial herbaceous plant with glandular-pubescent stems and foliage, and large red-and-yellow or pink-and-yellow flowers with long nectar spurs.

== Taxonomy ==
The species was originally described by the American botanist Stanley Larson Welsh as a variety fosteri of Aquilegia formosa, based on a type specimen collected by R. and R. Foster on the northern slope of Bridge Mountain in Washington County, Utah, on 25 May 1977, and two additional specimens collected by A. Woodbury in the same county in 1924 and held in the Zion National Park herbarium.

Welsh reassessed the plant as a distinct species A. fosteri in 2001, noting that specimens had also previously been assigned to Aquilegia desertorum but rejecting this attribution on the basis the glandular pubescence of the lower part of the stem and larger sepals and petals of A. fosteri.

The species is known to hybridize with Aquilegia chrysantha when seeds fall from the higher-elevation habitat of A. fosteri and germinate on the floor of Zion Canyon, the usual habitat of A. chrysantha. These hybrids lack the glandular foliage of A. fosteri and often have very broad and pale spurs.

=== Etymology ===
The specific epithet and former variety name fosteri honours the American botanist Robert Alan Foster (1938–2002), who collected the type specimen in 1977.

== Distribution and habitat ==
Aquilegia fosteri is native to northwestern Arizona and Zion Canyon in Utah, where it grows high on sandstone canyon walls in rock crevices.

== Conservation ==
As of January 2025, the species has not been assessed for the IUCN Red List.
