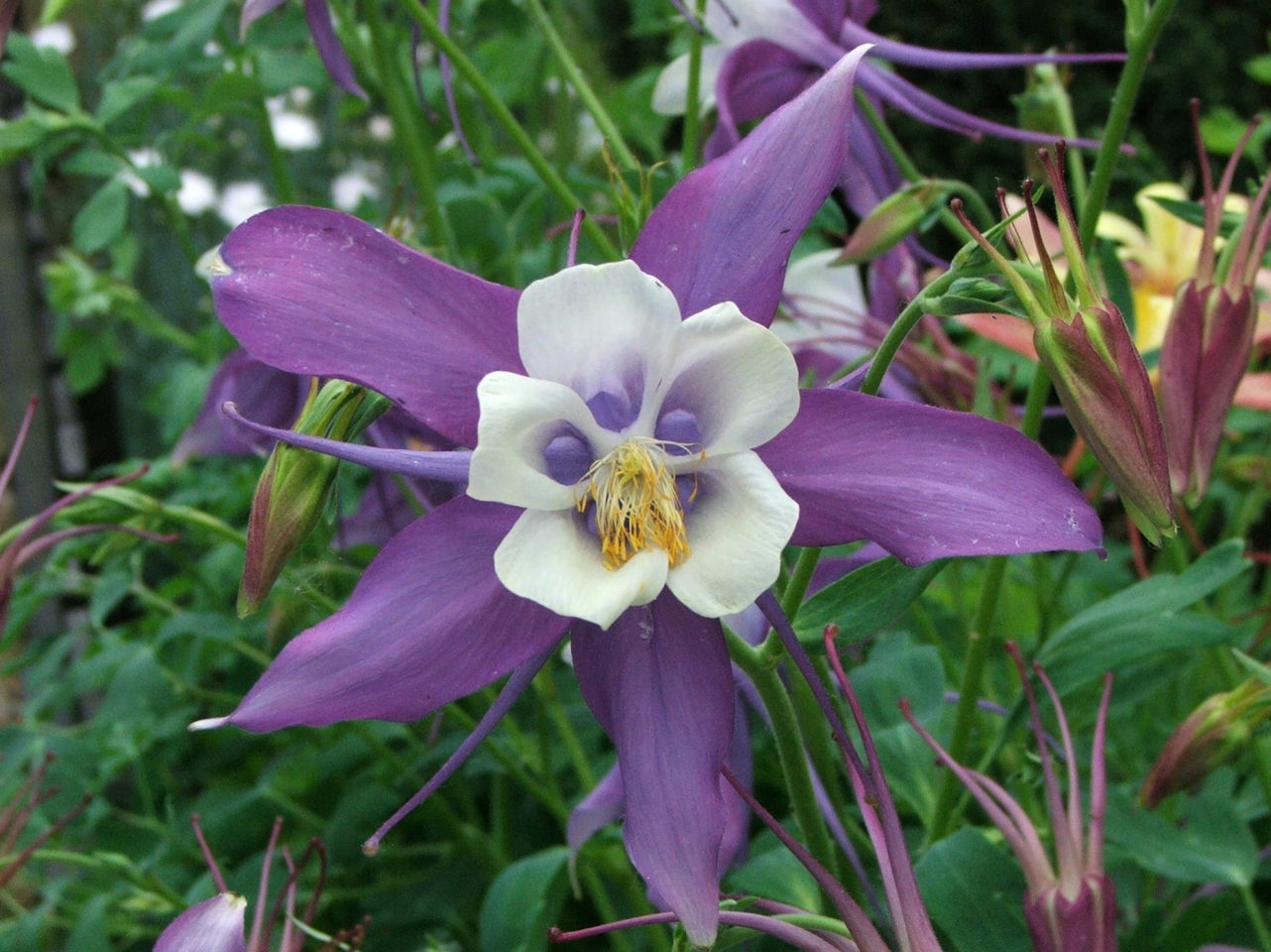
- Flower

Scientific classification
- Kingdom: Plantae
- Clade: Tracheophytes
- Clade: Angiosperms
- Clade: Eudicots
- Order: Ranunculales
- Family: Ranunculaceae
- Genus: Aquilegia
- Species: A. × hybrida

Binomial name
- Aquilegia × hybrida Sims

= Aquilegia × hybrida =

Species of flowering plant

Aquilegia × hybrida is a hybrid species of columbine, the result of a cross between Aquilegia vulgaris and Aquilegia canadensis.

== Description ==
Aquilegia × hybrida often has bicoloured flowers with blue or purple sepals and white petals, but can also be all-blue or all-white or many other colours. It grows to between 30 and 90 cm (12 and 35 in), and is a hardy perennial flowering in May and June.

== Taxonomy ==
Aquilegia × hybrida was first identified by the botanist John Sims in 1809 from examples sent from Brompton, now part of London. Sims was uncertain whether the plant was a hybrid or a species in its own right, noting that its similarity to Siberian examples of Aquilegia vulgaris at Kew Gardens might mean the latter, but also noting the variation between bicoloured and single-coloured form suggested hybridity.

== Cultivation ==
Varieties of Aquilegia × hybrida are very popular garden plants and widely grown commercially. Notable cultivars include:

- Biedermeier Group hybrids: 30–45cm, white, purple, yellow, pink and blue flowers
- 'Blue Star': 60cm, pendulous blue flowers
- 'Crimson Star': 60cm, bicoloured flowers with red sepals and creamy spurred petals
- 'Dragonfly' 60cm, long-spurred blooms in shades of white, pink, purple, yellow and blue
- 'Hensol Harebell' 60–75cm tall with pendulous blue flowers
- 'McKana': 60–75cm tall, long-spurred flowers in shades or red, yellow and blue, sometimes bicolour
- 'Mrs. Scott Elliot': 75–90cm, often bicolored, red and yellow or blue and white
- 'Music': 45–60cm, wide variety of flower colours
- 'Silver Queen' 75cm, pendulous pure white flowers
- 'Snow Queen' 75cm, pendulous pure white flowers
- 'Songbird' 60cm, large bicolor flowers in shades of pink, white, blue and red
