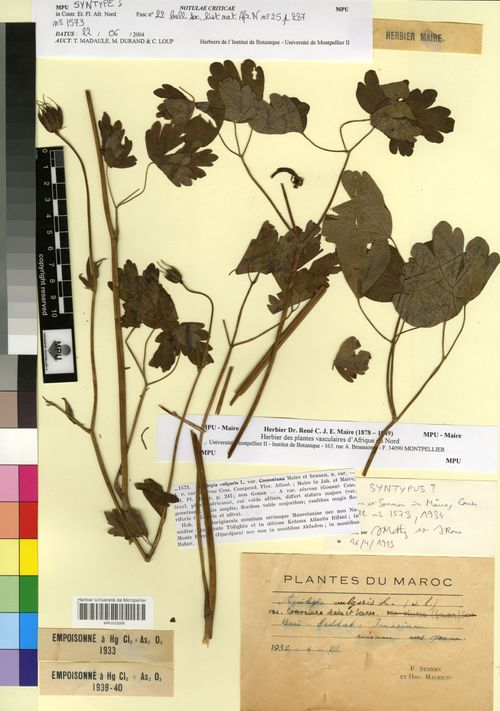
- Preserved specimen of Aquilegia cossoniana collected in Morocco (as Aquilegia vulgaris var. cossoniana)

Scientific classification
- Kingdom: Plantae
- Clade: Tracheophytes
- Clade: Angiosperms
- Clade: Eudicots
- Order: Ranunculales
- Family: Ranunculaceae
- Genus: Aquilegia
- Species: A. cossoniana

Binomial name
- Aquilegia cossoniana (Maire & Sennen) Rivas Mart.
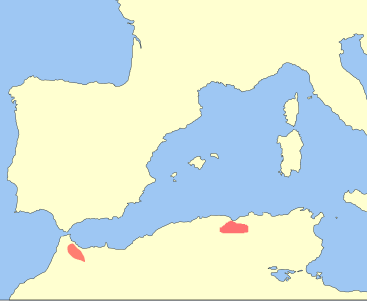
- Approximate native distribution of Aquilegia cossoniana in Morocco and Algeria

Synonyms
- Aquilegia vulgaris var. cossoniana Maire & Sennen; Aquilegia vulgaris subsp. cossoniana (Maire & Sennen) Dobignard & D.Jord.; Aquilegia nevadensis var. litardieri Sennen; Aquilegia vulgaris var. riffienensis Pau

= Aquilegia cossoniana =

North African columbine species

Aquilegia cossoniana is a perennial flowering plant in the family Ranunculaceae, native to the Atlas Mountains in northwestern Africa.

== Description ==
Aquilegia cossoniana is a perennial herb, closely resembling Aquilegia viscosa but with larger leaves and flowers, and 4–5 or more flowering stems.

== Taxonomy ==
The species was first described as a variety cossoniana of the common columbine, Aquilegia vulgaris, by René Maire and Frère Sennen in 1934. It was later reassessed as a subspecies of A. vulgaris by Alain Dobignard and Denis Jordan in 1987, and finally as a species in its own right by Salvador Rivas-Martínez in 2011.

=== Etymology ===
The specific epithet cossoniana honours the French botanist Ernest Cosson. In their 1934 description of the plant as a variety of Aquilegia vulgaris, Maire and Sennen noted its similarity to A. vulgaris var. viscosa, as described by Cosson in his work Compendium florae Atlanticae. They differentiated var. cossoniana by its taller stature, larger leaves, much larger flowers, and greater number of flowering stems.

== Distribution and habitat ==
Aquilegia cossoniana is native to northern Morocco and northern Algeria. It was recorded by René Maire and Frère Sennen in their 1934 description as growing in several locations in the Atlas Mountains: in Morocco, on Jbel Tidirhine and near Ketama; and in Algeria in the Djurdjura range, in mountains near Akfadou, and in the Babor Mountains.

== Conservation ==
As of December 2024, the species has not been assessed for the IUCN Red List.
