= Aquilegia pancicii =

Scientific classification
- Kingdom: Plantae
- Clade: Tracheophytes
- Clade: Angiosperms
- Clade: Eudicots
- Order: Ranunculales
- Family: Ranunculaceae
- Genus: Aquilegia
- Species: A. pancicii

Binomial name
- Aquilegia pancicii Degen

Species of flowering plant

Aquilegia pancicii is a perennial flowering plant species in the genus Aquilegia (columbine) in the family Ranunculaceae. Native to Serbia, it is endemic to the southeastern region of that country. The species has two-colored flowers that are blue and pale or white. It is not in cultivation.

== Description ==
Aquilegia pancicii is a species of herbaceous, perennial flowering plant in the family Ranunculaceae (buttercups).

A. pancicii has flowers that are small and nodding. In Aquilegia, each flower generally possesses five petaloid sepals and five petals. Each petal of Aquilegia typically comprises a broad portion protruding forward, known as a blade, and an elongated structure protruding backwards, known as a nectar spur. The spurs contain the nectar of the flower. On A. pancicii the sepals are blue-violet, while the petals are bicolored with blades that are a faded blue-violet towards the bottom and white or pale at their ends. The nectar spurs are blue-violet and longer than the blade of the petals they are on.

Certain mixtures of molecular compounds produce scents which may attract bees. Such compounds have been found in A. pancicii and similar columbines, indicating a possible adaption to assist in pollination.

== Taxonomy ==
Aquilegia pancicii was first described and given its binomial name in 1905 by the Hungarian biologist and botanist Árpád von Degen.

== Distribution ==
Aquilegia pancicii is native and endemic to southeastern Serbia. It predominately populates temperate biomes.

== Cultivation ==
In 2003, the American gardener and botanist reported that Aquilegia pancicii was not in cultivation. The American botanist Philip A. Munz had reported the same in 1946.
