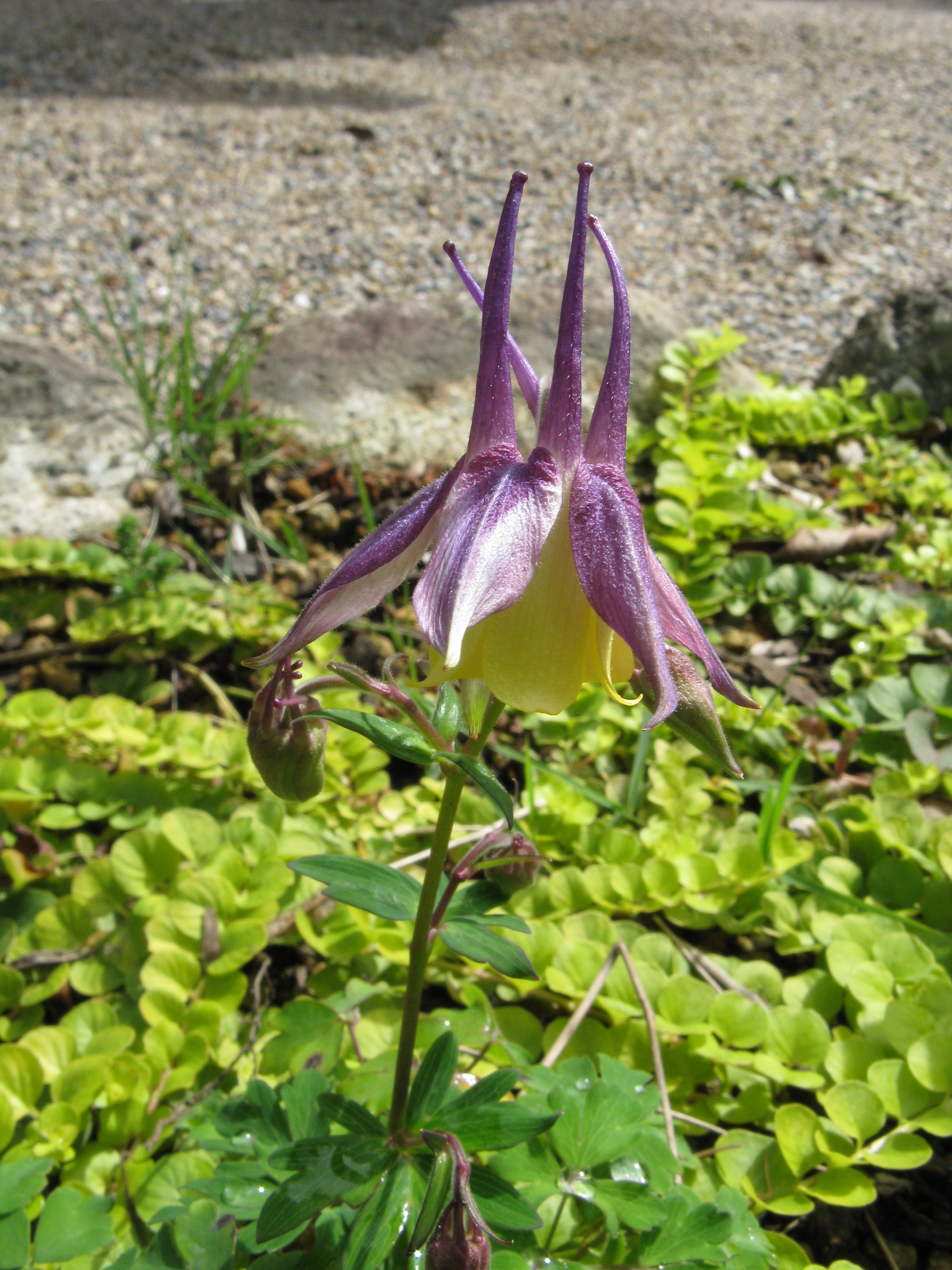
- Aquilegia × maruyamana in flower

Scientific classification
- Kingdom: Plantae
- Clade: Tracheophytes
- Clade: Angiosperms
- Clade: Eudicots
- Order: Ranunculales
- Family: Ranunculaceae
- Genus: Aquilegia
- Species: A. × maruyamana

Binomial name
- Aquilegia × maruyamana Kitam.
- Location of Mount Daisen, Honshu, to which Aquilegia × maruyamana is endemic

= Aquilegia × maruyamana =

Hybrid flowering plant

Aquilegia × maruyamana is a perennial flowering plant in the family Ranunculaceae, endemic to Japan. It is a natural hybrid of Aquilegia buergeriana and Aquilegia flabellata.

== Description ==
Aquilegia × maruyamana is a perennial herbaceous plant with downy follicles, long nectar spurs, yellow petals, and violet sepals.

== Taxonomy ==
Aquilegia × maruyamana is a naturally occurring hybrid of A. buergeriana and A. flabellata. The type specimen was collected on 29 May 1952 by Iwao Maruyama (Japanese: 丸山巌) on Mount Daisen in Tottori Prefecture, Honshu, Japan, and described as a new nothospecies by the Japanese botanist Shirō Kitamura (Japanese: 北村四郎) in 1953.

=== Etymology ===
The specific epithet maruyamana honours Iwao Maruyama, who collected the type specimen in 1952. Maruyama suggested the name ダイセンオダマキ ("Daisen columbine") for the plant, after the name of the mountain on which it was found.

== Distribution and habitat ==
Aquilegia × maruyamana is endemic to Mount Daisen in Tottori Prefecture on the Japanese island of Honshu.

== Conservation ==
As of May 2025, the species has not been assessed for the IUCN Red List.
