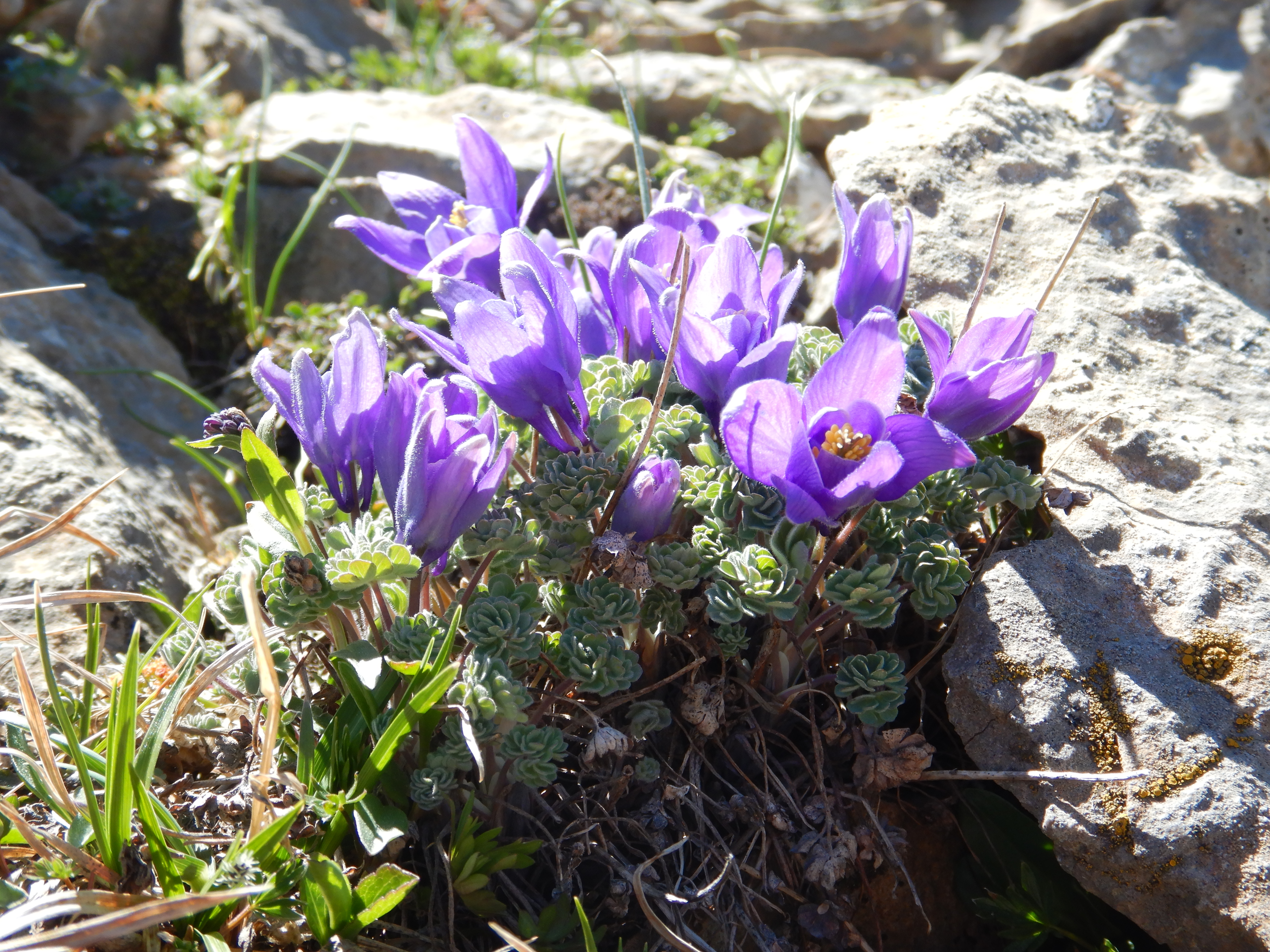
- Jones' columbine in flower

Conservation status
- Vulnerable (NatureServe)

Scientific classification
- Kingdom: Plantae
- Clade: Tracheophytes
- Clade: Angiosperms
- Clade: Eudicots
- Order: Ranunculales
- Family: Ranunculaceae
- Genus: Aquilegia
- Species: A. jonesii

Binomial name
- Aquilegia jonesii Parry

Synonyms
- Aquilegia jonesii var. elatior; Aquilegia jonesii subsp. elatior

= Aquilegia jonesii =

North American species of columbine

Aquilegia jonesii, the blue limestone columbine or Jones' columbine, is a perennial species of plant in the buttercup family, endemic to Alberta, Montana, and Wyoming.

== Description ==
Jones' columbine is a dwarf species, reaching only 3.5 to 12 centimeters in height. All of its leaves are basal, attached directly to the base of the plant rather than branching off a stem, forming a low mound. The leaves are nearly as tall as the stems, as much as 2.5–10 cm in height. The leaves are divided into ones or twice with crowded leaflets. The erect blue or purple flowers which bloom in June and July.

== Taxonomy ==
In 1874 Aquilegia jonesii was scientifically described and named by the botanist Charles Christopher Parry. It is classified in the genus Aquilegia within the wider Ranunculaceae family. It has no accepted subspecies or varieties, but a subspecies named elatior was described by Paul Carpenter Standley in 1921 and reclassified as a variety by H. Stuart Boothman in 1934. Neither is listed as an accepted taxa by Plants of the World Online.

== Names ==
The specific epithet jonesii honors Captain William A. Jones, U.S. Engineer, who was the commander of the 1873 expedition on which the species was documented, and who was the first to find a specimen. Aquilegia jonesii is known by the common names blue limestone columbine, limestone columbine, and Jones' columbine.

== Distribution and habitat ==
Jones' columbine grows in rocky places in subalpine limestone areas in northern Wyoming, northwest and central Montana, and southern Alberta, at altitudes from 1,800 to 3,400 meters (5,900–11,200 ft). At least 20 populations of the species have been documented, of which 16 are in Wyoming.

== Uses ==
Though the flowers are attractive the plant is not often grown due to difficulties with keeping it in cultivation. The plants are easy to grow from seed, but are not long lived and rarely bloom well.
