= Aquilegia grubovii =

Scientific classification
- Kingdom: Plantae
- Clade: Tracheophytes
- Clade: Angiosperms
- Clade: Eudicots
- Order: Ranunculales
- Family: Ranunculaceae
- Genus: Aquilegia
- Species: A. grubovii

Binomial name
- Aquilegia grubovii Erst, Luferov, Wei Wang & Kun Li Xiang

Species of flowering plant

Aquilegia grubovii is a perennial flowering plant in the family Ranunculaceae, native to northern Mongolia and Tuva in Russia.

== Description ==
Aquilegia grubovii is a perennial herbaceous plant with a thick rootstock and 3–9 flowering stems growing to 20–75 cm (8–30 in) high. The stems are erect, sparsely pubescent in the lower part, and glandular-pubescent towards the top. The base retains dry leaves from previous years' growth. The basal leaves are 5–25 cm (2–10 in) long, ternate or biternate, and have pubescent stalks of 4–15 cm (1.6–5.9 in) length. The leaflets are egg-shaped or rounded and have three lobes. The flowers are 1.5–2.2 cm (0.6–0.9 in) long and 1.8–3 cm (0.7–1.2 in) wide, with pointed, blue-purple or blue sepals 8–15 mm long, and bicoloured petals, blue or purple at the base and white or yellow at the tip. The nectar spurs are blue or purple, cone-shaped, and measure 1.5–3 cm (0.6–1.2 in) long, curved or hooked at the tip. The stamens protude beyond the petals by 1–4 mm, and the anthers are pale yellow.

== Taxonomy ==
Aquilegia grubovii was formally described in 2016 by Andrey S. Erst et al. The type specimen was collected on 26 July 1928 by N.P. and V.A. Ikonnikov-Galitskiy in the eastern Khentii Mountains in northern Mongolia, upstream of the Kherlen and Onon rivers.

It is a stable species of hybrid origin, related to Aquilegia oxysepala and Aquilegia ganboldii, with which it has similarities in sepal shape and its mixed types of pubescence (both simple and glandular trichomes). It is also related to Aquilegia sibirica and Aquilegia amurensis, which have similarly bicoloured flowers.

=== Etymology ===
The specific epithet grubovii honours the Russian botanist Valery Ivanovich Grubov (1917–2009), a specialist in Mongolian flora.

== Distribution and habitat ==
Aquilegia grubovii is native to northern Mongolia and Tuva in southern Siberia, growing in mountainous regions in rocky areas and birch forests.

== Conservation ==
As of January 2025, the species has not been assessed for the IUCN Red List. While no current threats to the species are known, its range is severely fragmented, with very small populations and significant specialisation to its habitat. Therefore, it has been recommended that the species be considered as Vulnerable (VU).
