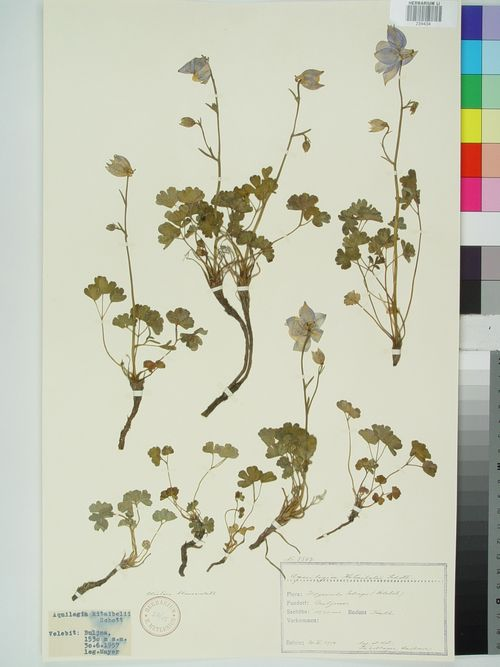
- Preserved specimen

Conservation status
- Data Deficient (IUCN 3.1)

Scientific classification
- Kingdom: Plantae
- Clade: Tracheophytes
- Clade: Angiosperms
- Clade: Eudicots
- Order: Ranunculales
- Family: Ranunculaceae
- Genus: Aquilegia
- Species: A. kitaibelii

Binomial name
- Aquilegia kitaibelii Schott

Synonyms
- List: Aquilegia pyrenaica var. kitaibelii (Schott) Fiori; Aquilegia vulgaris var. kitaibelii (Schott) Brühl; Aquilegia vulgaris subsp. kitaibelii (Schott) Bonnier; Aquilegia kitaibelii var. minor Vis.

= Aquilegia kitaibelii =

Species of flowering plant

Aquilegia kitaibelii is a perennial species of plant in the family Ranunculaceae, native to Croatia, Bosnia and Herzegovina, and possibly Slovenia.

== Description ==
Aquilegia kitaibelii grows to 40cm tall and has one to two (occasionally up to six) blue-violet flowers. It has unusually small leaflets, an adaptation common to several mountain species in the genus such as Aquilegia einseleana and Aquilegia pyrenaica. Unlike those species, however, the leaflets are pubescent (covered in fine hairs) on both sides.

== Taxonomy ==
The specific name kitaibelii was chosen in his description of the species by Heinrich Wilhelm Schott to honour the Hungarian botanist Pál Kitaibel (1757–1817), who had classified the plant as Aquilegia viscosa.

== Distribution and habitat ==
The species is endemic to the Dinaric Alps of Croatia and Bosnia and Herzegovina, growing in only a few locations, with unconfirmed reports of a population on the Snežnik plateau in Slovenia. It grows in scree and rocky crevices on limestone, at altitudes between 1,200 and 1,700 m (3,900 and 5,600 ft), with small populations occasionally as low as 800 m (2,600 ft).
