= Aquilegia hirsutissima =

Scientific classification
- Kingdom: Plantae
- Clade: Tracheophytes
- Clade: Angiosperms
- Clade: Eudicots
- Order: Ranunculales
- Family: Ranunculaceae
- Genus: Aquilegia
- Species: A. hirsutissima

Binomial name
- Aquilegia hirsutissima Timb.-Lagr. ex Gariod

Synonyms
- Aquilegia viscosa subsp. hirsutissima (Timb.-Lagr. ex Gariod) Breistr.; Aquilegia kitaibelii var. minor Rouy & Foucaud; Aquilegia magnolii var. minor Rouy; Aquilegia pyrenaica var. decipiens Gren.; Aquilegia viscosa var. decipiens (Gren. & Godr.) Breistr.

Species of flowering plant

Aquilegia hirsutissima is a perennial flowering plant in the family Ranunculaceae, native to France and Spain.

== Description ==
Aquilegia hirsutissima is a perennial herb growing to 10–20 cm (3.9–7.9 in) tall. It has a thick, woody taproot with many stems which are woody at the base and covered with dead leaf stalks from previous years' growth. The stems and leaves are very bristly with glandular hairs, slightly sticky to the touch. The leaves are smooth underneath but hairy and green on the upper surface, with three wedge-shaped and slightly overlapping leaflets with short stalks. The flowers are small, pale azure-blue, and bristly, with pointed sepals turning paler towards the end, and rounded petals with a small notch on the edge and a slightly curved nectar spur. The anthers are sulphur-yellow.

== Taxonomy ==
Aquilegia hirsutissima was described in 1882 (published 1884) by the French botanist Charles Henri Gariod, expanding a brief description by Édouard Timbal-Lagrave. It is considered a subspecies hirsutissima of Aquilegia viscosa by some sources but generally accepted as a separate species.

=== Etymology ===
The specific epithet hirsutissima means "very hairy, hairiest" in Latin, referring to the plentiful hairs on the stems, leaves, and flowers.

== Distribution and habitat ==
Aquilegia hirsutissima is native to southern France and northeastern Spain, where it grows in dry limestone environments, especially on north-facing slopes.

== Conservation ==
As of January 2025, the species has not been assessed for the IUCN Red List.

== Ecology ==
Aquilegia hirsutissima flowers from late May to June.
