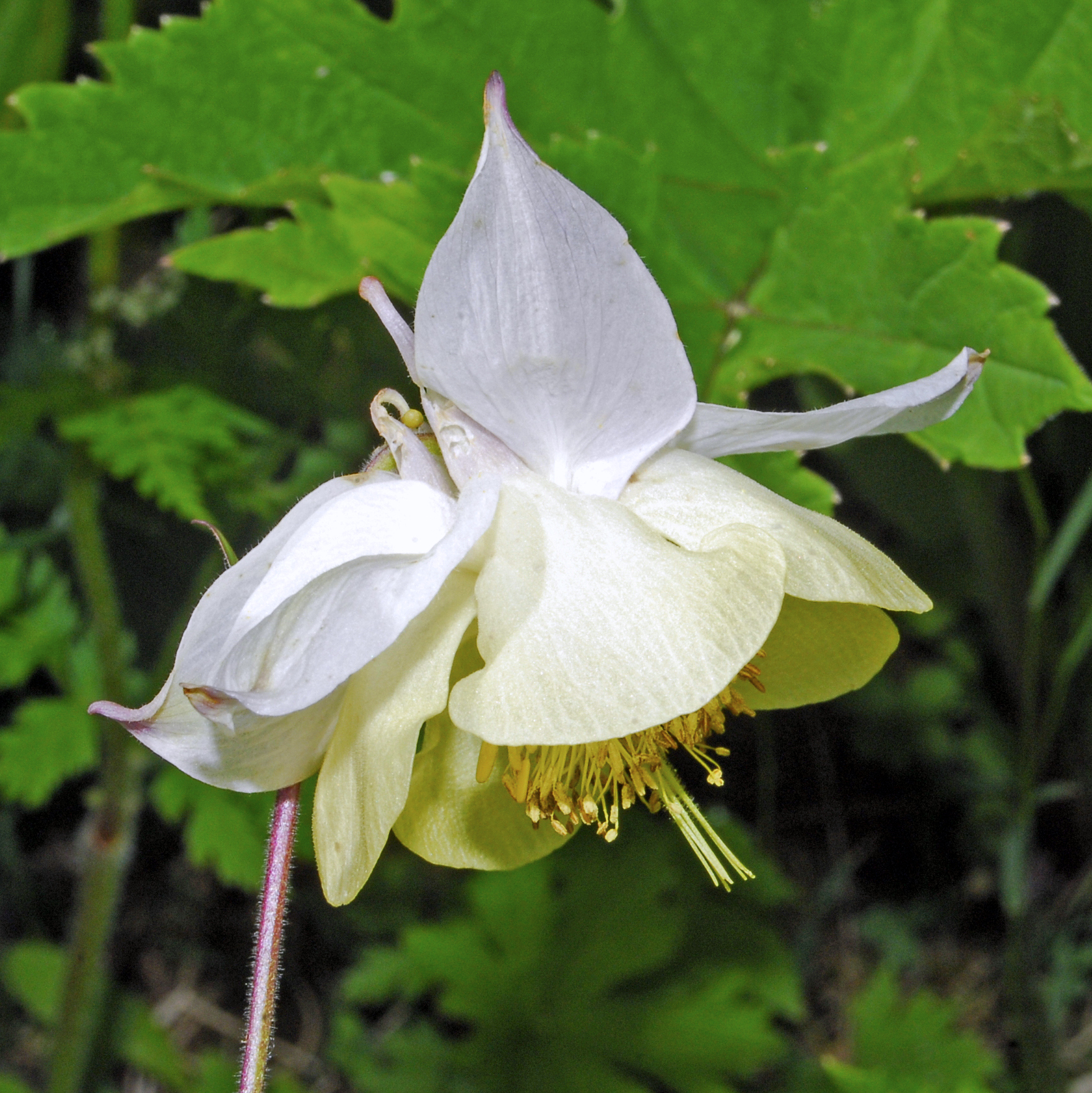
- Flower of Aquilegia fragrans at the Giardino Botanico Alpino Chanousia

Scientific classification
- Kingdom: Plantae
- Clade: Tracheophytes
- Clade: Angiosperms
- Clade: Eudicots
- Order: Ranunculales
- Family: Ranunculaceae
- Genus: Aquilegia
- Species: A. fragrans

Binomial name
- Aquilegia fragrans Benth.

Synonyms
- Aquilegia vulgaris var. fragrans (Benth.) Aitch.; Aquilegia glauca Lindl.; Aquilegia glauca var. himalayica Rapaics; Aquilegia kanaoriensis var. suaveolens Cambess.; Aquilegia suaveolens Brühl; Aquilegia vulgaris var. glauca Brühl; Aquilegia vulgaris var. himalaica Brühl; Aquilegia vulgaris var. suaveolens Brühl

= Aquilegia fragrans =

Himalayan species of columbine

Aquilegia fragrans, the fragrant columbine or sweet-scented columbine, is a perennial species of flowering plant in the family Ranunculaceae, native to the Western Himalayas.

== Description ==
Aquilegia fragrans grows to 30–80 cm (12–31 in) in height. The rootstock is slender with the upper part covered by previous years' leaf-stalks. The stems are branched and densely hairy with glands below the flowers. The basal leaves are biternate with long hairy stalks. Its leaflets are wedge- or teardrop-shaped, paler and hairy beneath, green and usually hairless above, with two or three lobes. The flowers are horizontal or slightly nodding with whitish or pale purple sepals measuring 20–30 mm (0.79–1.18 in) in length. The petals are usually paler than the sepals and 15–18 mm (0.59–0.71 in) long, with straight or slightly curved nectar spurs measuring 15–18 mm (0.59–0.71 in).

== Taxonomy ==
The species is part of a clade containing several Western, Southern and Central Asian species of columbine, that likely split from their closest relatives in Eurasia in the mid-Pliocene, approximately 3.37 million years ago.

=== Etymology ===
The specific epithet fragrans means "fragrant" in Latin.

== Distribution and habitat ==
This species is native to subalpine meadows in the Western Himalayas at altitudes of 2,400–3,600 m (7,900–11,800 ft). It is present in the Kunar, Nuristan, Laghman, Nangarhar, and Parwan provinces of Afghanistan, the Khyber Pakhtunkhwa province and Gilgit-Baltistan and Azad Kashmir regions of Pakistan, and the Himachal Pradesh, Punjab, and Uttarakhand states and Jammu and Kashmir union territory of India.

== Ecology ==
Aquilegia fragrans flowers from June to August.

== Conservation ==
The species has not been assessed for the IUCN Red List.

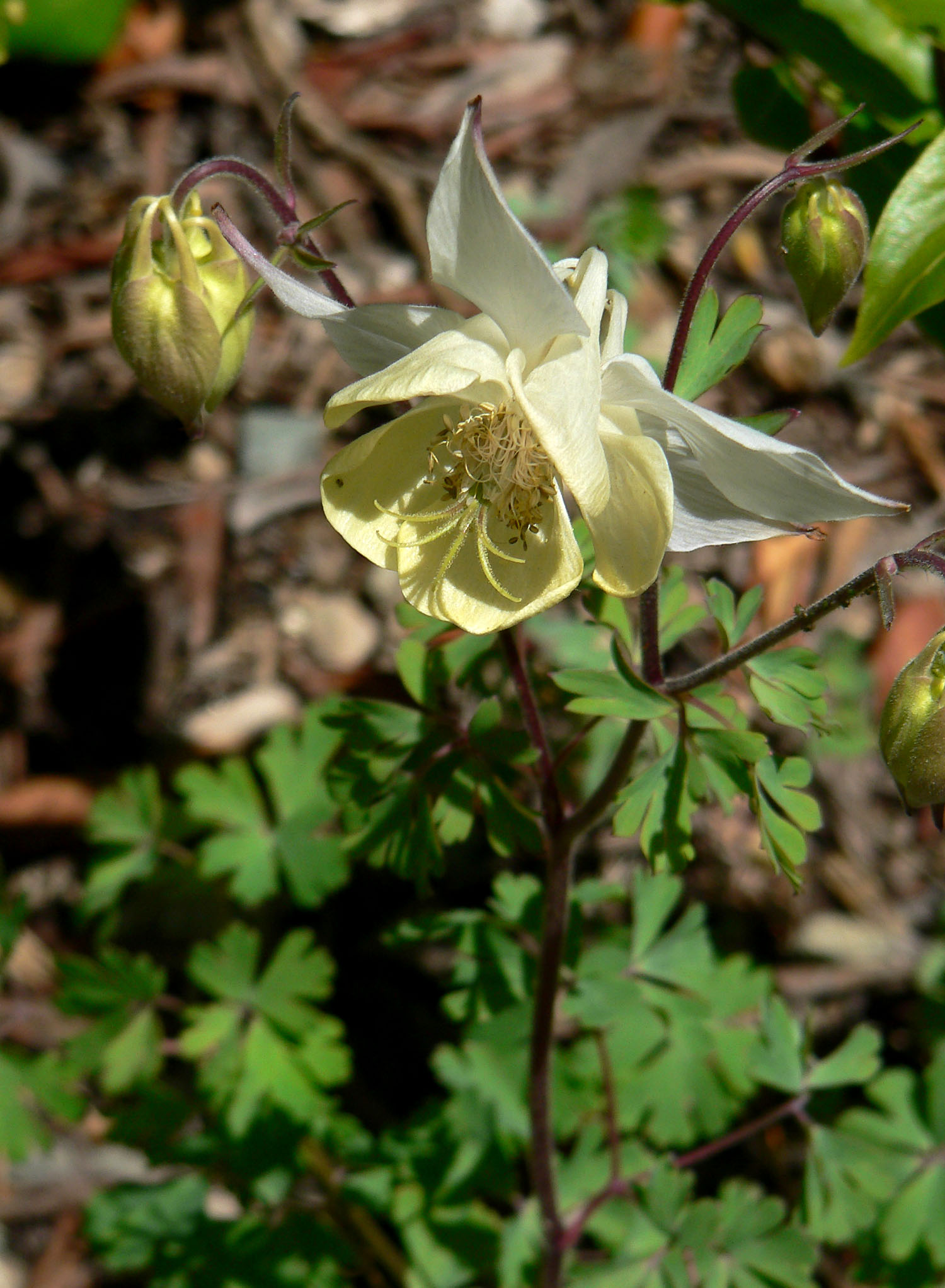
Plant of Aquilegia fragrans

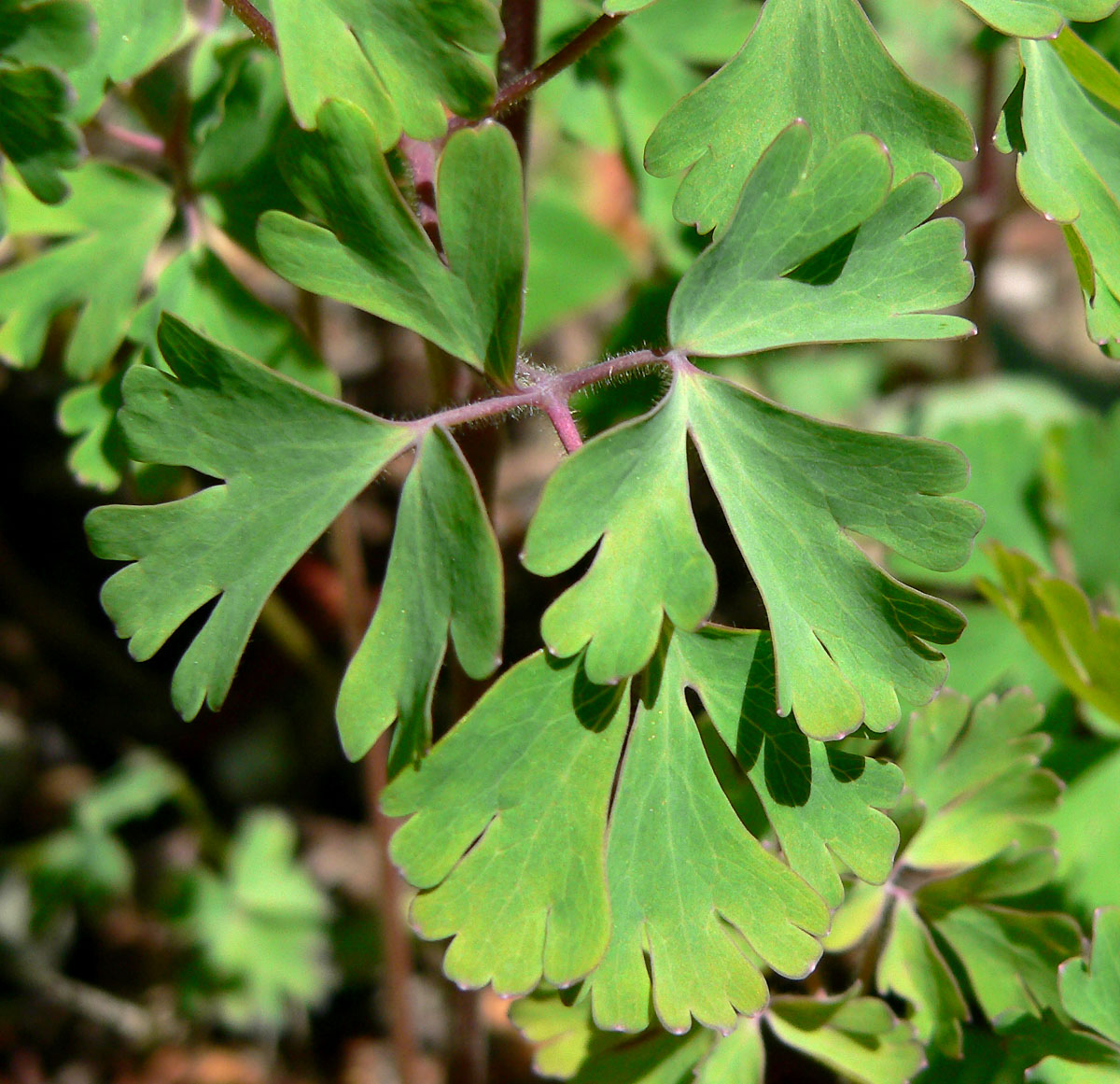
Leaves
