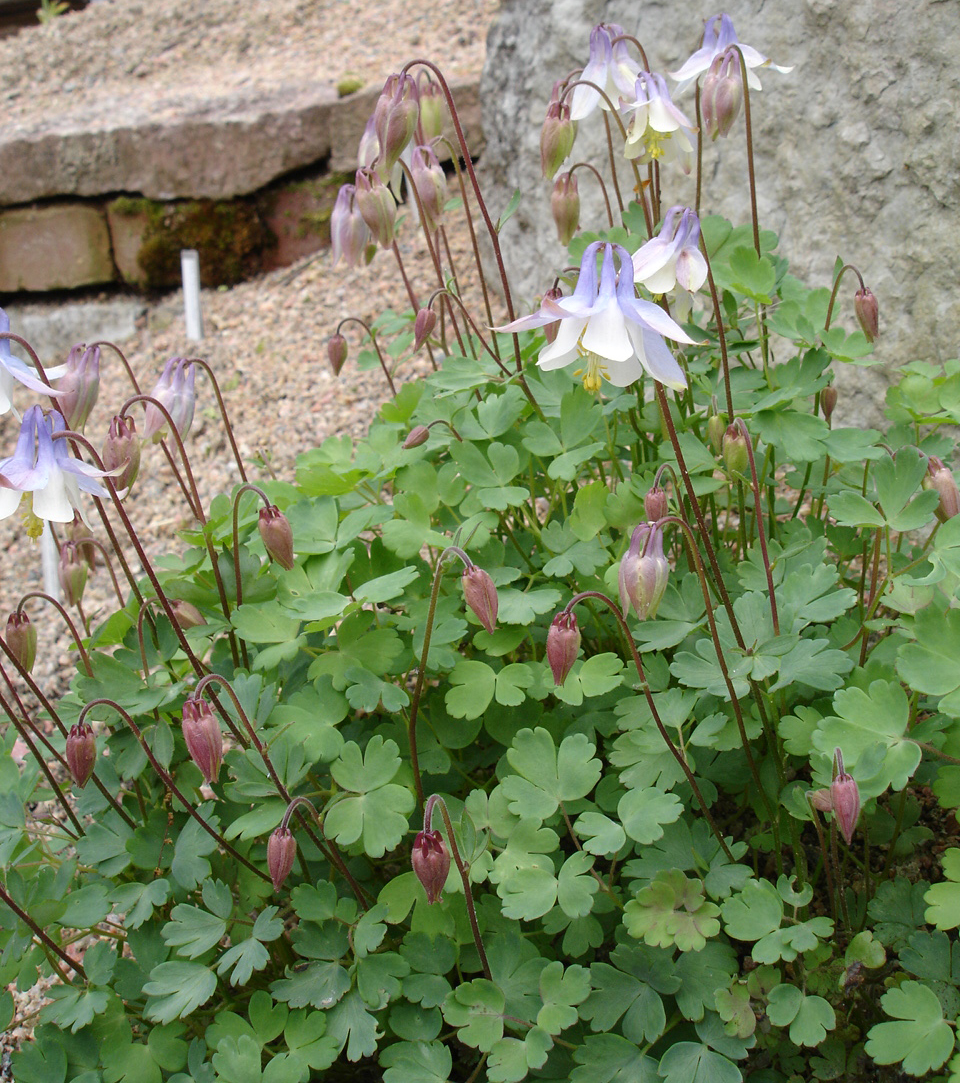
- Aquilegia amaliae

Scientific classification
- Kingdom: Plantae
- Clade: Tracheophytes
- Clade: Angiosperms
- Clade: Eudicots
- Order: Ranunculales
- Family: Ranunculaceae
- Genus: Aquilegia
- Species: A. amaliae

Binomial name
- Aquilegia amaliae Heldr. ex Boiss.

Synonyms
- Aquilegia ottonis var. amaliae (Heldr.) Rapaics; Aquilegia ottonis subsp. amaliae (Heldr. ex Boiss.) Nyman; Aquilegia vulgaris var. amaliae (Heldr.) Brühl

= Aquilegia amaliae =

Balkan columbine species

Aquilegia amaliae, common name Amalia's columbine, is a perennial species of plant in the family Ranunculaceae, native to the southern Balkans.

== Description ==
The plant is slightly shorter and more slender than the similar but more widespread Aquilegia vulgaris, with pale blue-violet sepals and pale purple nectar spurs.

== Taxonomy ==
The species is sometimes considered a subspecies of Aquilegia ottonis.

=== Etymology ===
The specific epithet amaliae honours Amalia of Oldenburg, the wife of King Otto of Greece after whom A. ottonis is named.

== Distribution and habitat ==
The species is native to Albania, Greece, and North Macedonia. It grows in rocky mountainous habitats.

== Conservation ==
As of December 2024, the species has not been assessed for the IUCN Red List.

== Ecology ==
Aquilegia amaliae is known to be attacked by the smut fungus Urocystis sorosporioides, which creates pustules on the leaves.
