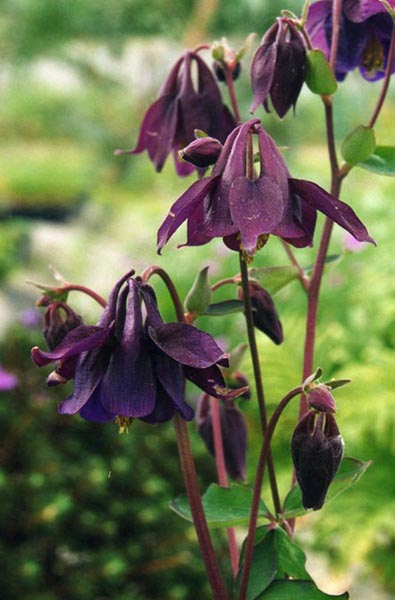
- Flowers of Aquilegia nigricans

Conservation status
- Data Deficient (IUCN 3.1)

Scientific classification
- Kingdom: Plantae
- Clade: Tracheophytes
- Clade: Angiosperms
- Clade: Eudicots
- Order: Ranunculales
- Family: Ranunculaceae
- Genus: Aquilegia
- Species: A. nigricans

Binomial name
- Aquilegia nigricans Baumg.

Synonyms
- List: Aquilegia atrata var. macrantha Schur; Aquilegia vulgaris var. nigricans (Baumg.) Schur; Aquilegia vulgaris subsp. nigricans (Baumg.) Domin; Aquilegia longisepala Zimmeter; Aquilegia vulgaris var. glandulosopilosa Schur; Aquilegia vulgaris var. longisepala (Zimmeter) Brühl; Aquilegia vulgaris subsp. longisepala (Zimmeter) Domin; Aquilegia vulgaris var. parviflora Schur; Aquilegia vulgaris var. sooi Kováts ex Soó

= Aquilegia nigricans =

Bulgarian columbine

Species of flowering plant native to Europe

Aquilegia nigricans, the Bulgarian columbine, is a perennial species of flowering plant in the family Ranunculaceae, native to central and southeastern Europe.

== Description ==
Aquilegia nigricans has nodding, dark brownish-purple flowers, dark purple stems covered with downy hair, and biternate basal leaves.

== Taxonomy ==
=== Etymology ===
The specific epithet nigricans means "blackish" or "swarthy" in Latin, referring to the colour of the flowers.

== Distribution and habitat ==
Aquilegia nigricans is native to several non-contiguous, mainly mountainous areas in the eastern Alps, the Carpathian Mountains, and the southern and eastern Balkans. It is found in Slovenia, Austria, Bulgaria, North Macedonia, Romania, and Greece, and in small areas of southeastern Poland, eastern Slovakia, northwestern Croatia, eastern Bosnia and Herzegovina, western Hungary, Serbia, and western Ukraine. Reports of specimens in the Friuli-Venezia Giulia region of northeastern Italy are thought to have been erroneous.

== Conservation ==
As of November 2024, Aquilegia nigricans was listed as Data deficient (DD) by the IUCN Red List. This status was last assessed on 27 March 2014.
