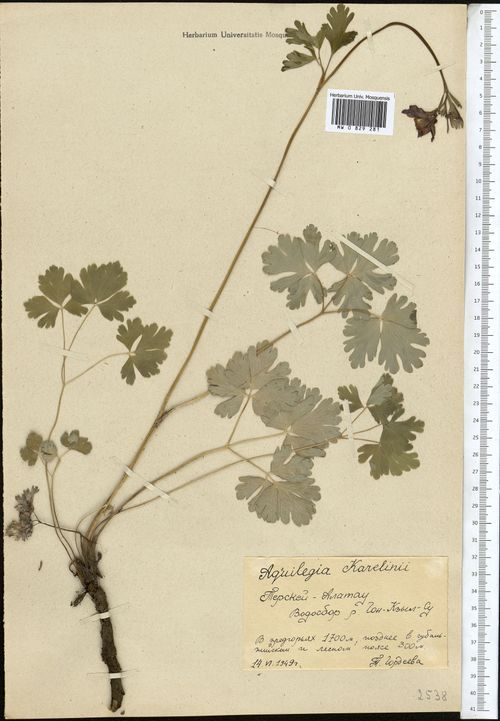
- Preserved specimen from Kyrgyzstan

Scientific classification
- Kingdom: Plantae
- Clade: Tracheophytes
- Clade: Angiosperms
- Clade: Eudicots
- Order: Ranunculales
- Family: Ranunculaceae
- Genus: Aquilegia
- Species: A. karelinii

Binomial name
- Aquilegia karelinii (Baker) O.Fedtsch. & B.Fedtsch.

Synonyms
- List: Aquilegia vulgaris var. karelinii Baker; Aquilegia hybrida var. bicolor Regel; Aquilegia kareliniana C.A.Mey. ex Trautv.

= Aquilegia karelinii =

Central Asian species of columbine

Aquilegia karelinii, the Afghan columbine, is a perennial species of plant in the family Ranunculaceae, native to Central Asia.

== Description ==
The species grows to 80cm tall, differing from the widespread A. vulgaris by its pubescent stems, more membranous leaves, and narrower, deeper ultimate lobes. Its flowers are bright lilac or claret-purple, and its flowering period is late spring to early summer. It is pollinated by bees.

== Taxonomy ==
The specific name karelinii honours the Russian explorer and naturalist Grigory Karelin (1801–1872).

== Distribution and habitat ==
Despite its common name "Afghan", Aquilegia karelinii is not native to Afghanistan, but to Kyrgyzstan, Kazakhstan, Tajikistan, Uzbekistan, and Xinjiang. It grows in damp ravines, wooded mountain slopes, forest meadows, and alpine zones at altitudes of 900–3600m.
