= Aleksandra Gamayunova =

Soviet botanist (1904–1971)

Aleksandra Pavlovna Gamajunova
- Born: 1904; Yekaterinodar region, Russian Empire
- Died: 1971 (aged 66–67)
- Education: Southern Federal University
- Scientific career
- Fields: Botany
- Workplaces: Kazakhstan Academy of Sciences
- Author abbrev. (botany): Gamajun.

Aleksandra Pavlovna Gamajunova (Russian: Александра Павловна Гамаюнова) (1904–1971) was a Soviet botanist.

== Early life and education ==
Gamajunova was the daughter of a gunsmith working in Izhevsk who returned to the Yekaterinodar region as an invalid in 1916 and, no longer able to work in his speciality, set up a typhus hospital. The conditions were very poor and he died of typhus in 1920, Gamajunova and her two sisters also contracting the disease. She studied in Rostov-on-Don and defended her PhD thesis in 1939.

== Career ==
In 1939 Gamajunova enrolled as a senior researcher at the Kazakhstan branch of the Academy of Sciences of the USSR. She became director in 1945, succeeding Nikolai Vasilievich Pavlov, and held this position until retiring due to illness in 1954. The remainder of her life was dedicated to cataloguing and describing the flora of Kazakhstan.
