= Aquilegia chitralensis =

Scientific classification
- Kingdom: Plantae
- Clade: Tracheophytes
- Clade: Angiosperms
- Clade: Eudicots
- Order: Ranunculales
- Family: Ranunculaceae
- Genus: Aquilegia
- Species: A. chitralensis

Binomial name
- Aquilegia chitralensis Qureshi & Chaudhri

Pakistani columbine species

Aquilegia chitralensis is a perennial flowering plant in the family Ranunculaceae, endemic to Pakistan.

== Description ==
Aquilegia chitralensis is a perennial herb growing to 15–35 cm (5.9–13.8 in) tall. The basal leaves are biternate, with leaflets that are smooth on their upper sides and hairy underneath. The flowers are solitary, with rose-pink petals and slightly curved nectar spurs.

== Taxonomy ==
Aquilegia chitralensis was formally described by the Pakistani botanists Rizwana Aleem Qureshi and Mohammad Nazeer Chaudhri in 1979. The species is similar to Aquilegia pubiflora, differing in having pink flowers with a slightly curved spur.

=== Etymology ===
The specific epithet chitralensis is taken from Chitral District in Pakistan.

== Distribution and habitat ==
Aquilegia chitralensis is endemic to the former Chitral District in northern Pakistan, where it grows in rocky areas.

== Conservation ==
As of November 2024, the species has not been assessed for the IUCN Red List.

== Ecology ==
Aquilegia chitralensis flowers in early summer.
