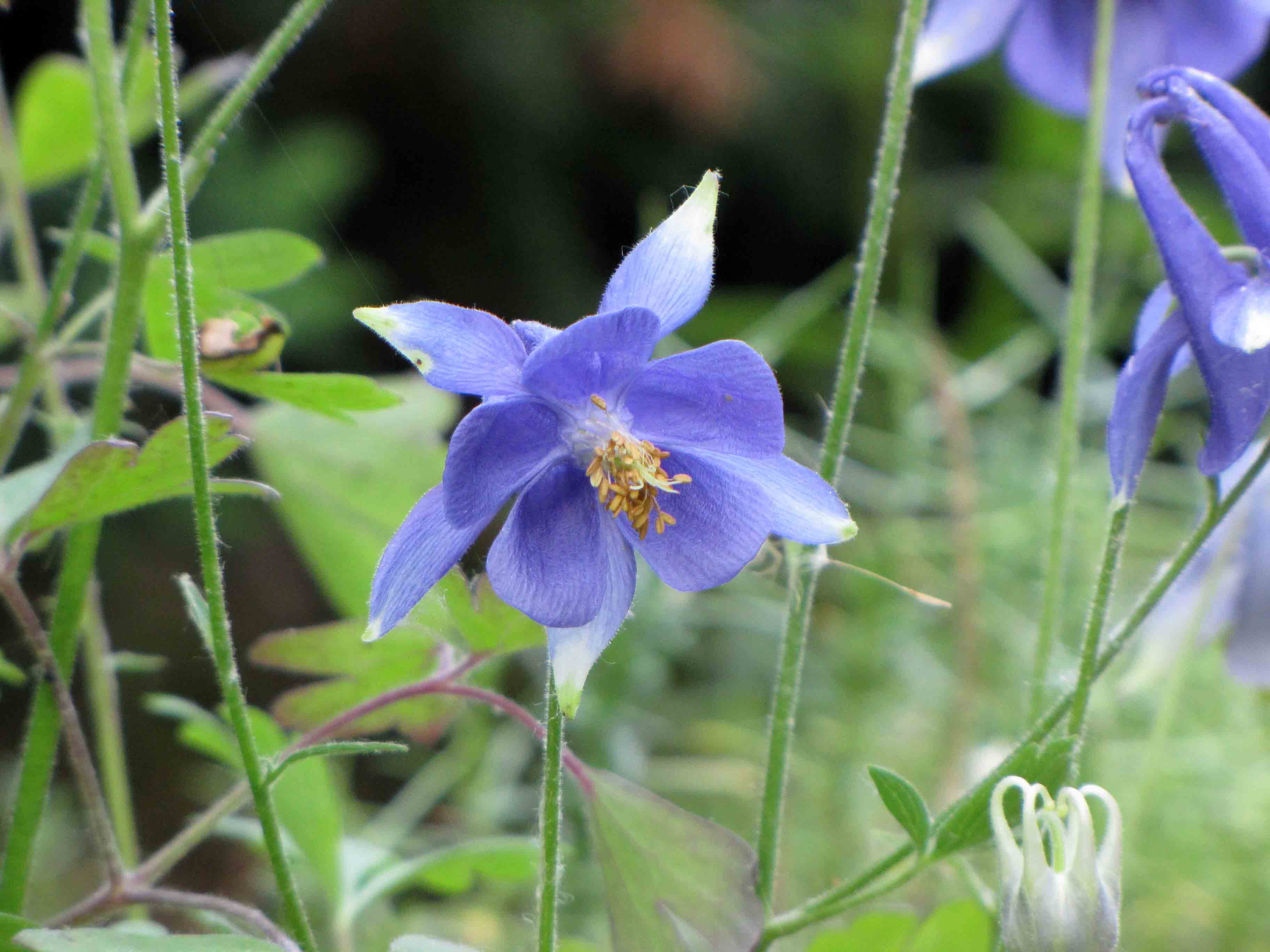
- Flower

Scientific classification
- Kingdom: Plantae
- Clade: Tracheophytes
- Clade: Angiosperms
- Clade: Eudicots
- Order: Ranunculales
- Family: Ranunculaceae
- Genus: Aquilegia
- Species: A. magellensis

Binomial name
- Aquilegia magellensis F.Conti & Soldano

Synonyms
- List: Aquilegia magellensis Huter, Porta & Rigo; Aquilegia ottonis var. magellensis (Huter, Porta & Rigo) Rapaics; Aquilegia ottonis var. unguisepala Borbás; Aquilegia vulgaris f. magellensis Fiori; Aquilegia vulgaris subf. magellensis (Fiori) Fiori

= Aquilegia magellensis =

Species of flowering plants

Aquilegia magellensis is a perennial species of plant in the family Ranunculaceae, native to Italy.

== Description ==
Aquilegia magellensis grows to 20–45 cm high with sky blue to violet-blue petals.

== Taxonomy ==
The species was first named magellensis (after Ferdinand Magellan) in a collection of dried specimens collected by Rupert Huter, Pietro Porta, and Gregorio Rigo in 1877. This did not however meet the standard for valid publication, making Aquilegia magellensis a nomen nudum until formally described by Fabio Conti and Adriano Soldano in 2005.

== Distribution and habitat ==
Aquilegia magellensis is endemic to central Italy, where it grows on calcareous cliffs at altitudes around 1400m.
