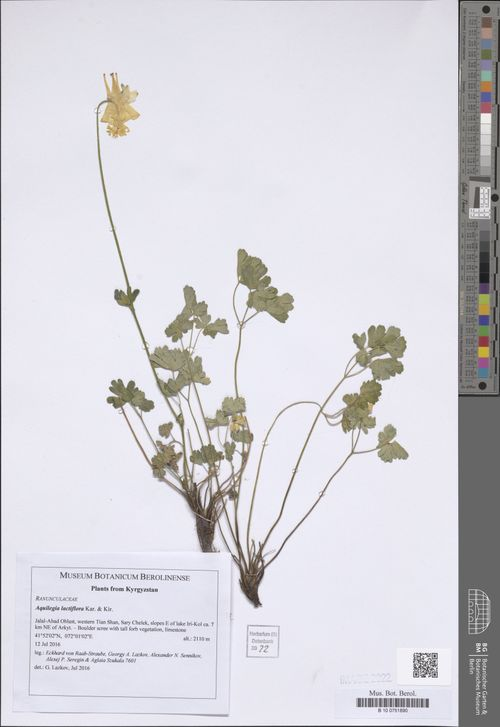
- Preserved specimen

Scientific classification
- Kingdom: Plantae
- Clade: Tracheophytes
- Clade: Angiosperms
- Clade: Eudicots
- Order: Ranunculales
- Family: Ranunculaceae
- Genus: Aquilegia
- Species: A. lactiflora

Binomial name
- Aquilegia lactiflora Kar. & Kir.

Synonyms
- List: Aquilegia vulgaris subsp. lactiflora (Kar. & Kir.) Brühl; Aquilegia coelestis Fed.; Aquilegia darwazii Korsh.; Aquilegia lactiflora var. dichroantha Fisch. & C.A.Mey.; Aquilegia lactiflora var. leucantha Fisch. & C.A.Mey.; Aquilegia moorcroftiana var. lactiflora Korsh.

= Aquilegia lactiflora =

Species of flowering plant

Aquilegia lactiflora is a perennial species of plant in the family Ranunculaceae, native to Central Asia and the Himalayas.

== Description ==
Aquilegia lactiflora is 40–80 cm (16–31 in) tall and has white, cream, or greenish-white flowers with the petals bent outwards and the stamens extending beyond them, and white sepals. It flowers between May and August.

== Taxonomy ==
The specific name lactiflora, "milk-flower", refers to the pale colour of the petals and sepals of the plant.

== Distribution and habitat ==
The species is native to Central Asia and the Himalayas, recorded in Kazakhstan, Kyrgyzstan, Tajikistan, Uzbekistan, Pakistan, northwest Xinjiang, and in Jammu and Kashmir in India. It grows in shaded rocky habitats and grassy slopes.
