= Stanley Larson Welsh =

American botanist (1928–2025)

Stanley Larson Welsh (September 7, 1928 – January 30, 2025) was an American botanist. He worked as professor of integrative biology at Brigham Young University for 47 years and was the founding curator of that university's herbarium, which is named after him. His fields were North American and Tahitian flora, especially the genera Astragalus, Oxytropis and Atriplex. Welsh died on January 30, 2025, at the age of 96.

== Selected publications ==
- stanley larson Welsh; sherel Goodrich. 1980. Miscellaneous Plant Novelties from Alaska, Nevada, and Utah. Great Basin Naturalist 40:78-88

=== Books ===
- 1960. Legumes of the north-central states: Galegeae. Ed. Iowa Agricultural & Home Economics Experiment Station. 249 pp.
- 2003. North American Species of Atriplex Linnaeus (Chenopodiaceae): A Taxonomic Revision. ISBN 978-0-8425-2562-6
- nephi duane Atwood, sherel Goodrich, stanley larson Welsh. 2007. A Utah Flora. Ed. Brigham Young University. ISBN 978-0-8425-2701-9
