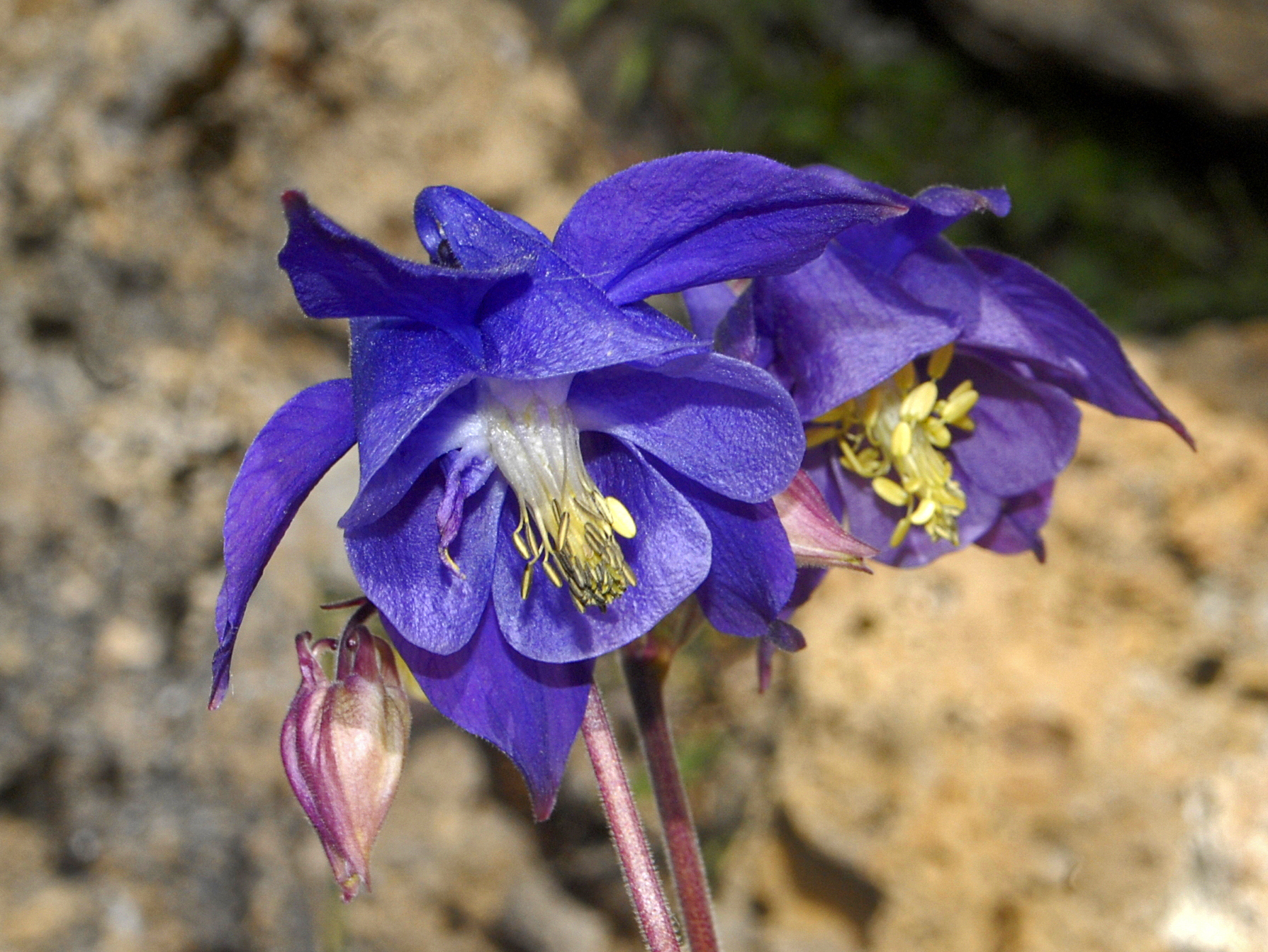
- Aquilegia pyrenaica flowers, at the Giardino Botanico Alpino Chanousia

Scientific classification
- Kingdom: Plantae
- Clade: Tracheophytes
- Clade: Angiosperms
- Clade: Eudicots
- Order: Ranunculales
- Family: Ranunculaceae
- Genus: Aquilegia
- Species: A. pyrenaica

Binomial name
- Aquilegia pyrenaica DC. in Lam & DC

Synonyms
- Aquilegia aragonensis Willk. Synonym WCSP (in review); Aquilegia beata Rapaics; Aquilegia beata var. condemnata Rapaics; Aquilegia discolor var. aragonensis (Willk.) Gürke; Aquilegia pyrenaica f. aragonensis (Willk.) Willk.; Aquilegia pyrenaica var. macrantha Fisch.; Aquilegia pyrenaica var. pusilla Fisch.; Aquilegia vulgaris subsp. pyrenaica (DC.) Hook.f. & Thomson; Aquilegia vulgaris var. pyrenaica (DC.) Walp.; Aquilina pyrenaea (DC.) Bubani

= Aquilegia pyrenaica =

Pyrenean endemic species of columbine

Aquilegia pyrenaica, common name Pyrenean columbine, is a species of flowering plant in the family Ranunculaceae. It is endemic to the Pyrenees where it grows on grassland and in rocky places. It was first described in 1805 by Augustin Pyramus de Candolle who gave it the name Aquilegia pyrenaica.

== Description ==
Aquilegia pyrenaica can reach a height of 10 to 30 cm (4 to 12 in). This plant is closely related to the taller Aquliegia alpina. Stem is usually simple, more or less glabrous. The leaves are bluish-green and trifoliate, the petioles clasping the stem. The flowers are bright blue or lilac, 3 to 5 cm (1.2 to 2.0 in) across and 2.5 to 3.5 cm (1.0 to 1.4 in) long. Technically, the blue spreading outer parts of the flower are sepals, and the paler blue inner parts are the true petals. The petals bear spurs at the back of the flower that contain nectar and attract the plant's pollinators. The spurs are long, slender and very little curved in this species, and the stamens are yellow and protruding. The carpels are not fused together. This plant blooms from April to June.

== Habitat ==
This species prefers pastures and rocky places at an altitude of 1,000 to 1,600 metres (3,300 to 5,200 ft).

== Distribution ==
This species is native to France and the Pyrenees. It was introduced into cultivation in Britain in 1818, and in 1895, it was planted on rock ledges in Caenlochan Glen in Angus, Scotland, where it became naturalised. It has also appeared at Doncaster Sheffield Airport in 1986 as a casual arrival.
