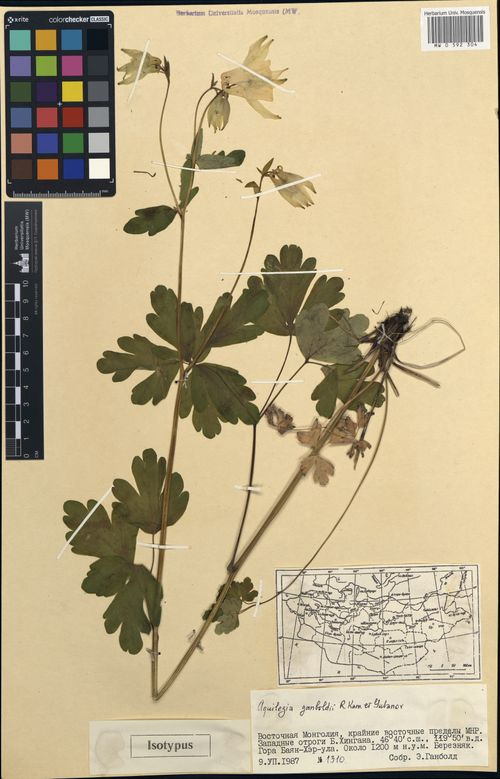
- Type specimen of Aquilegia ganboldii in Moscow University Herbarium

Scientific classification
- Kingdom: Plantae
- Clade: Tracheophytes
- Clade: Angiosperms
- Clade: Eudicots
- Order: Ranunculales
- Family: Ranunculaceae
- Genus: Aquilegia
- Species: A. ganboldii

Binomial name
- Aquilegia ganboldii Kamelin & Gubanov

= Aquilegia ganboldii =

Species of flowering plant

Aquilegia ganboldii is a perennial flowering plant in the family Ranunculaceae, native to Mongolia, northeast China, North Korea, and Siberia.

== Description ==
Aquilegia ganboldii is a perennial herbaceous plant growing to 60 cm (24 in) tall. The stems are branched near the flowers and covered with both simple and glandular hairs. The leaves are long with short stems, and triternate (i.e. having three leaflets each of which is biternate), with each leaflet having its own stem and being rounded in shape. Further along the stem, the leaves become tripinnate in shape. The flowers are milk-white or creamy, turning yellowish when dry, and measure 3–4 cm (1.2–1.6 in) across, with pointed oblong sepals 2–3 cm (0.8–1.2 in) long, smooth rounded petals 1.5–2 cm (0.6–0.8 in) long, and broad nectar spurs 1.5–2 cm (0.6–0.8 in) long which are curved at the tip. The staminodes measure 8–8.5 mm in length.

== Taxonomy ==
=== Taxonomic history ===
Aquilegia ganboldii was formally described by the Soviet botanists Rudolf Kamelin and Ivan Gubanov in 1991 (with the slightly different spelling A. gandboldii), from the type specimen collected on 9 July 1987 by E. Ganbold in the far east of Mongolia, near the Chinese border.

=== Phylogeny ===
The taxonomic position of A. ganboldii is unclear. Kamelin and Gubanov assigned the species to a clade also containing Aquilegia karelinii, Aquilegia atrovinosa, Aquilegia oxysepala, and Aquilegia flabellata. Of these, they considered A. oxysepala its closest relative. However, these species do not form a distinct group based on morphological and molecular data, and instead A. ganboldii appears to belong to a smaller group with Aquilegia buergeriana and A. oxysepala var. oxysepala.

=== Etymology ===
The specific epithet ganboldii honours E. Ganbold, who collected the type specimen in 1987.

== Distribution and habitat ==
Aquilegia ganboldii is native to Dornod Province in far-eastern Mongolia, Jilin and Hebei provinces in northeastern China, North Hamgyong Province in northeastern North Korea, and Zabaykalsky Krai in southeastern Siberia.

Its typical habitat is mountainous forest-steppes and oak and birch forests at altitudes of 1,000–1,200 m (3,300–3,900 ft), although it can be found as low as 300 m (980 ft) and as high as 2,000 m (6,600 ft).

== Conservation ==
As of January 2025, the species has not been assessed for the IUCN Red List. The Russian botanist Andrey S. Erst recommended in 2015 that it be considered as Data Deficient (DD) given the lack of population and distribution data available.

== Ecology ==
Aquilegia ganboldii typically grows in forests dominated by Asian white birch, Dahurian birch, or Mongolian oak.
