= Desert columbine =

Desert columbine can refer to several species in the genus Aquilegia, including:

- Aquilegia chrysantha, native to the Southwestern United States and Mexico
- Aquilegia desertorum, native to Arizona, New Mexico, and Utah in the United States
- Aquilegia shockleyi, native to California and Nevada in the United States
