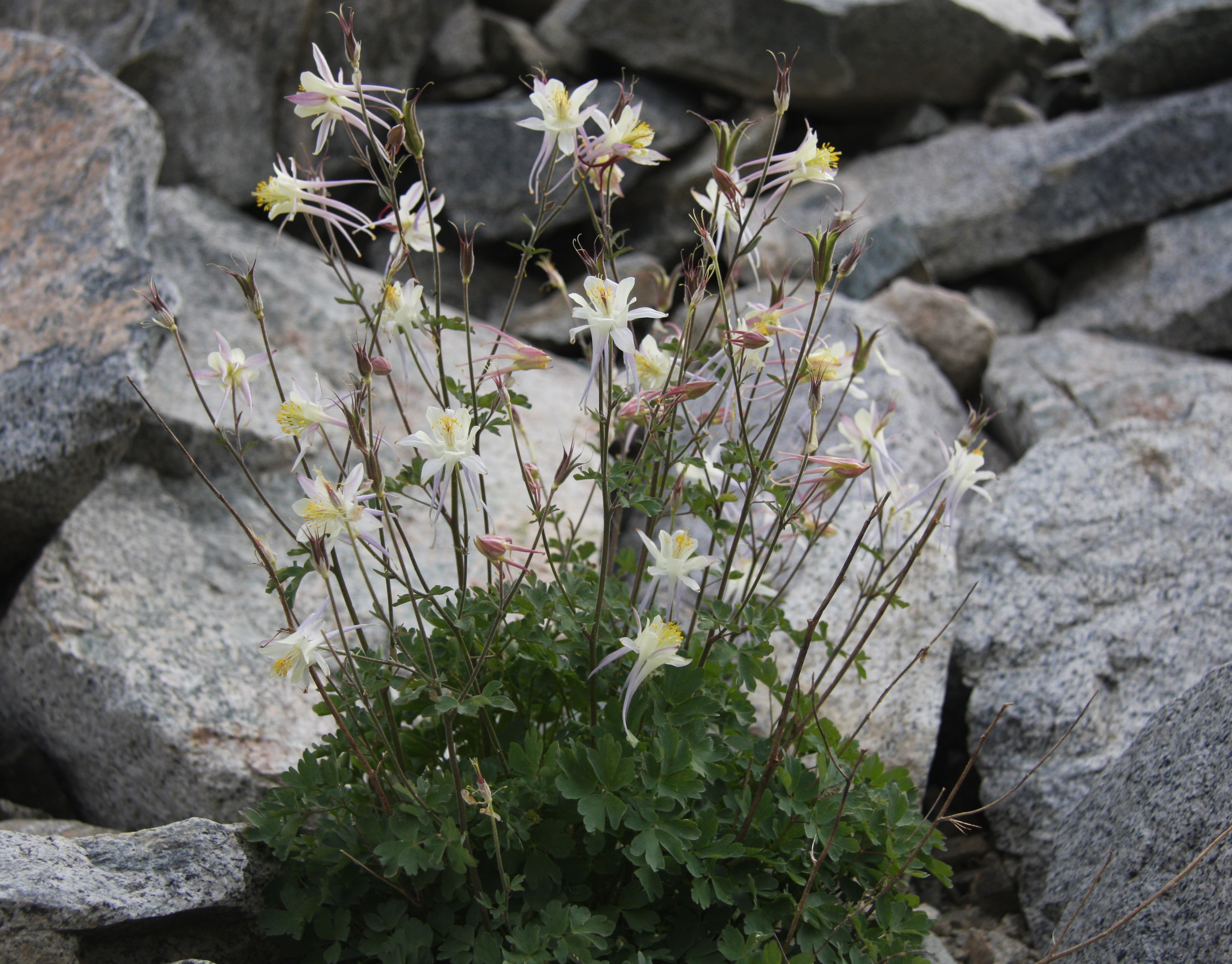
- White-flowered Aquilegia pubescens plant among rocks in the Sierra Nevada, California

Conservation status
- Vulnerable (NatureServe)

Scientific classification
- Kingdom: Plantae
- Clade: Tracheophytes
- Clade: Angiosperms
- Clade: Eudicots
- Order: Ranunculales
- Family: Ranunculaceae
- Genus: Aquilegia
- Species: A. pubescens

Binomial name
- Aquilegia pubescens Coville

Synonyms
- Aquilegia coerulea f. pubescens (Coville) Rapaics

= Aquilegia pubescens =

Californian endemic species of columbine

Aquilegia pubescens is a perennial flowering plant in the family Ranunculaceae, endemic to the Sierra Nevada in California. It is usually known by the common name Sierra columbine, and less frequently as the alpine columbine (not to be confused with the European Aquilegia alpina) or Coville's columbine.

== Description ==
Aquilegia pubescens is a small species growing to 15–50 cm (5.9–19.7 in) in height. The rootstock is densely covered with the remains of previous years' leaves, and the stems are mostly smooth with sparse hairs towards the top. The leaves are ternate and the leaflets densely pubescent below, and somewhat less so on their upper surface. The 2–5 flowers are erect or spreading, rather than drooping. The characteristic nectar spurs may be up to 5 cm (2.0 in) long and the flowers up to 5 cm (2.0 in) wide. The sepals and the petals are generally cream or white, less often pink or yellow. The round, fused mouth protrudes, enclosing a cluster of long yellow stamens.

== Taxonomy ==
Aquilegia pubescens is part of a clade containing all the North American species of columbines that likely split from their closest relatives in East Asia in the mid-Pliocene, approximately 3.84 million years ago. It is closely related to the hummingbird-pollinated Aquilegia eximia, Aquilegia flavescens, and Aquilegia formosa.

The Sierra columbine can hybridize with the lower-elevation Aquilegia formosa (crimson columbine) where their ranges overlap. This produces flowers with intermediate color, spur length, and orientation, as shown in the transition-series image, providing a change also in pollinator species: hawkmoths for A. pubescens and hummingbirds for A. formosa. Barriers to gene flow between the species are maintained primarily through their specialisation to different habitats, and secondarily to different pollinators.

=== Etymology ===
The specific epithet pubescens means "hairy" in Latin, referring to the densely pubescent leaflets which Frederick Vernon Coville identified as a distinguishing feature in his original species description of the plant.

== Distribution and habitat ==
The species is endemic to the High Sierra in California. An isolated record from Colorado is likely to have been a non-native introduced specimen. It is found in alpine and subalpine climates, often on open, rocky slopes, between 8,000–12,000 ft (2,400–3,700 m).

== Ecology ==
Aquilegia pubescens is pollinated by hawkmoths. It flowers in May and June.

== Conservation ==
As of November 2024, NatureServe listed Aquilegia pubescens as Vulnerable (G3) worldwide. This status was last reviewed on 12 May 1999. It has not been assessed for the IUCN Red List.

== Gallery ==
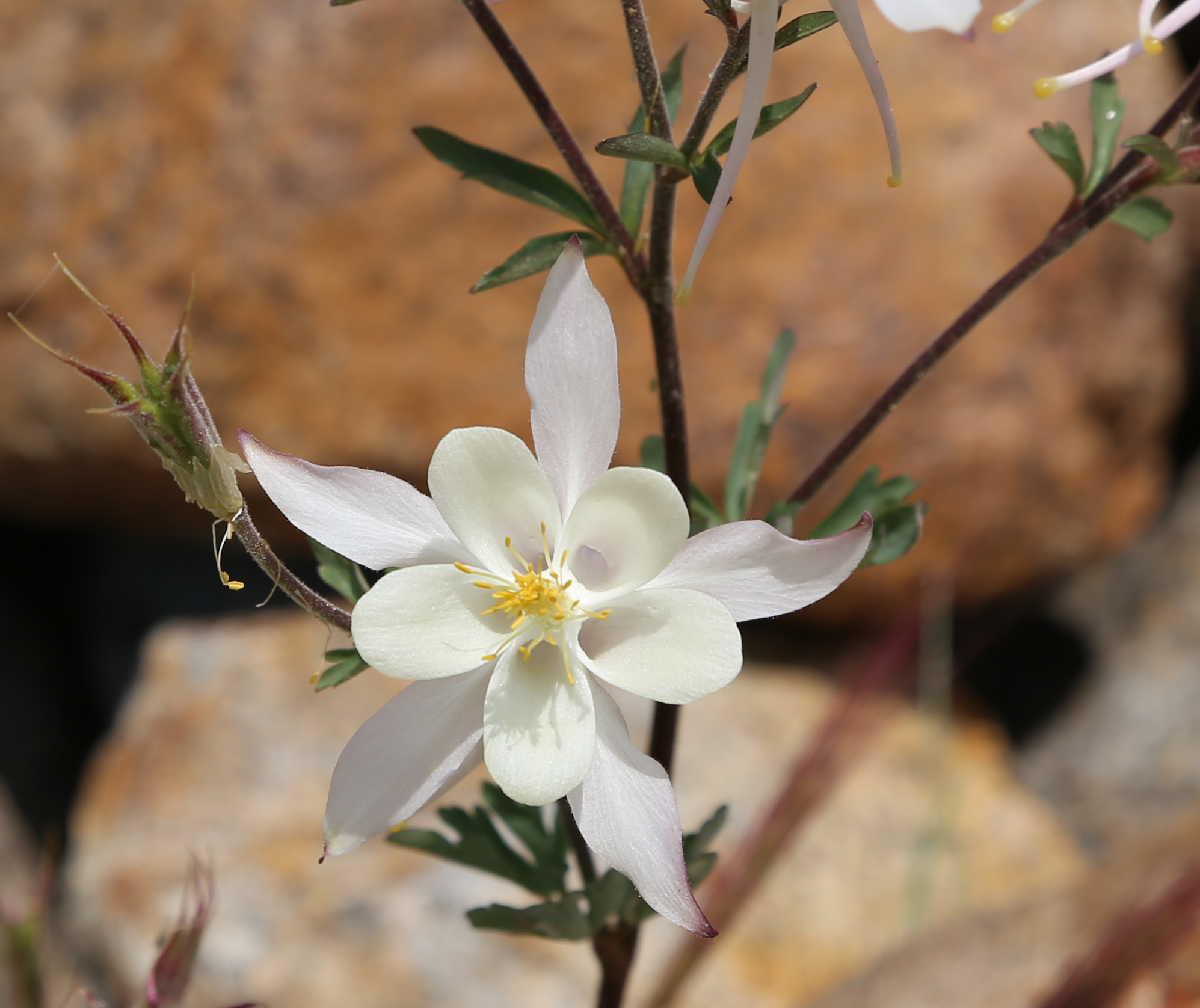
Aquilegia pubescens flower, full-face

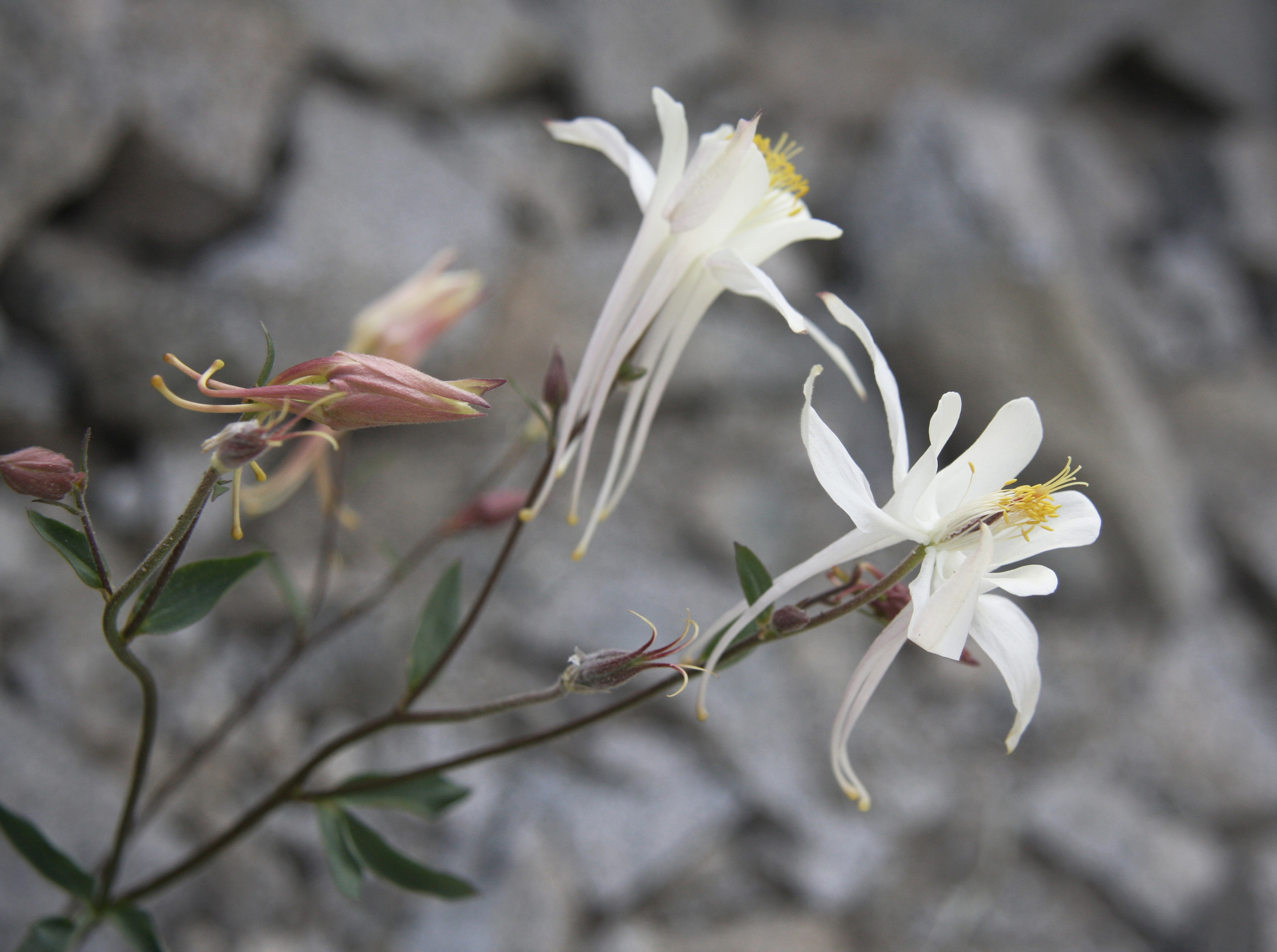
Aquilegia pubescens bud & flowers

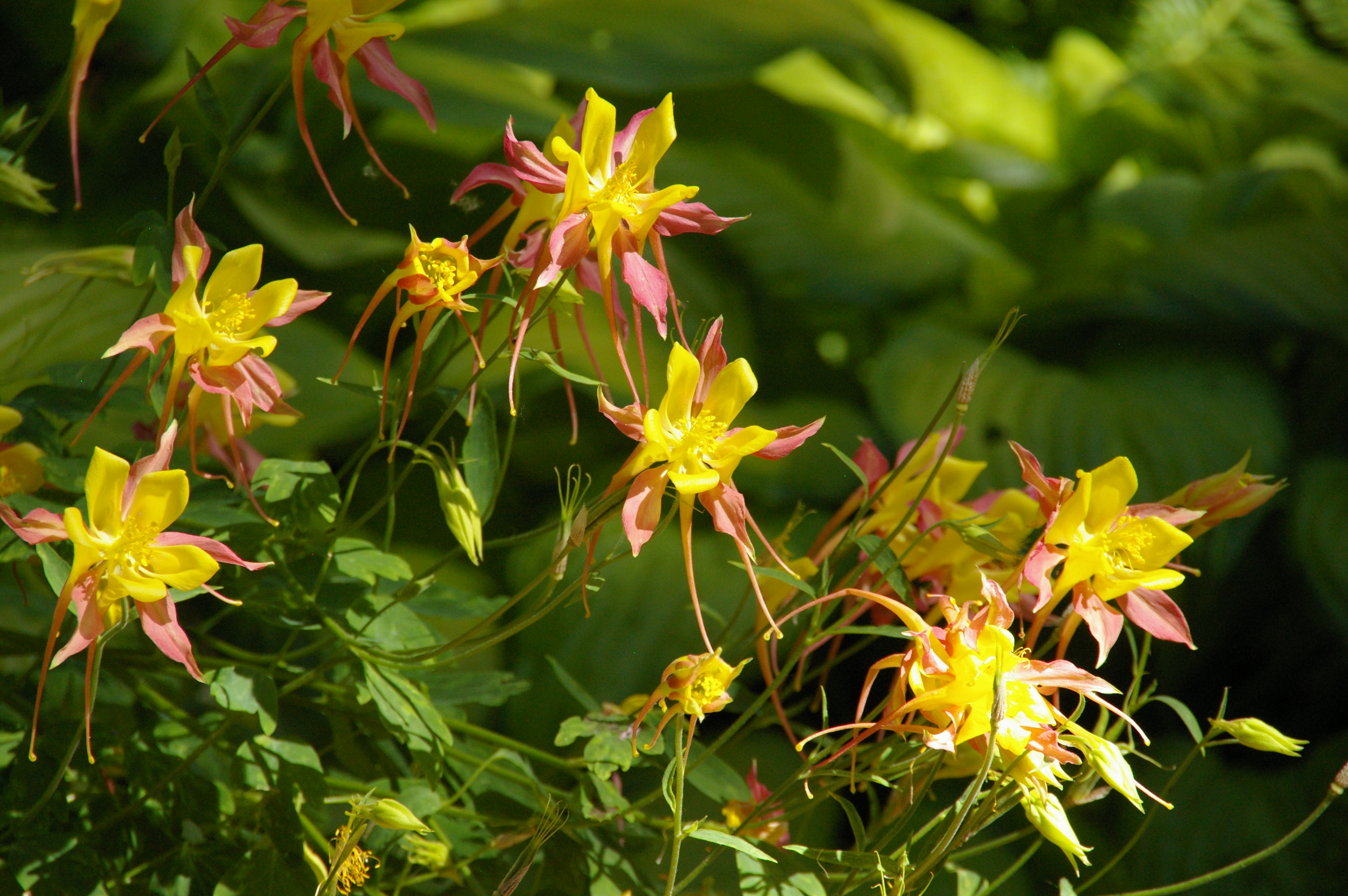
An unusual Aquilegia pubescens at Red Butte Gardens

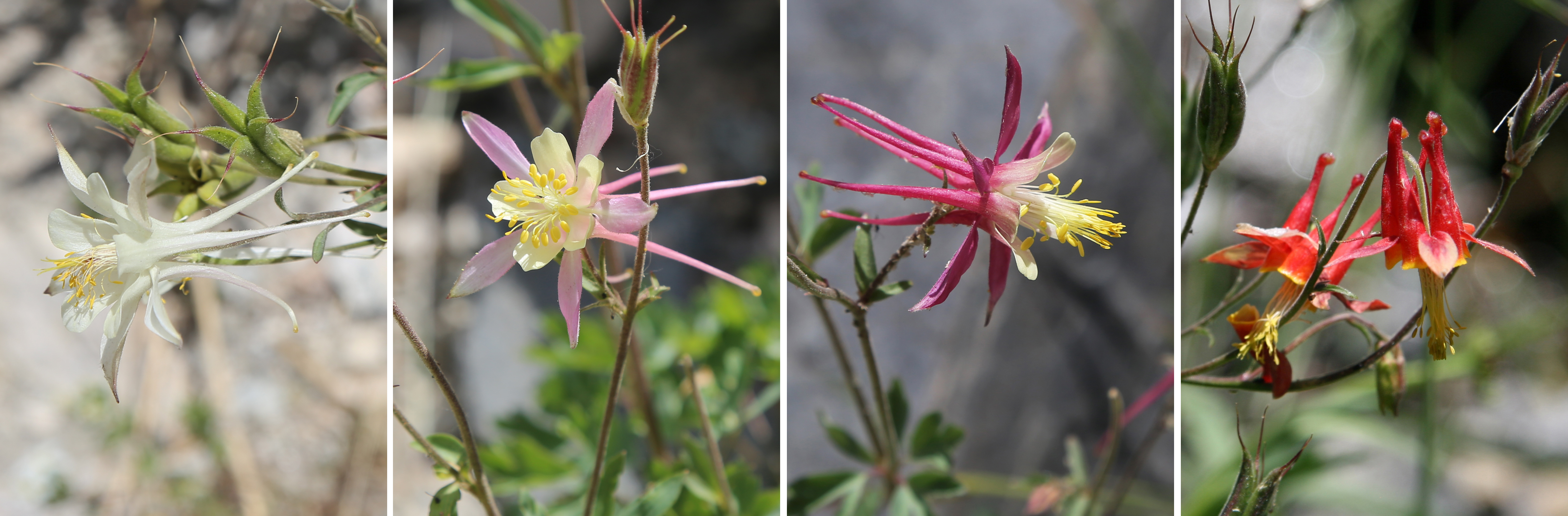
Transition of hybrid forms between the white A. pubescens and the red-&-yellow A. formosa
