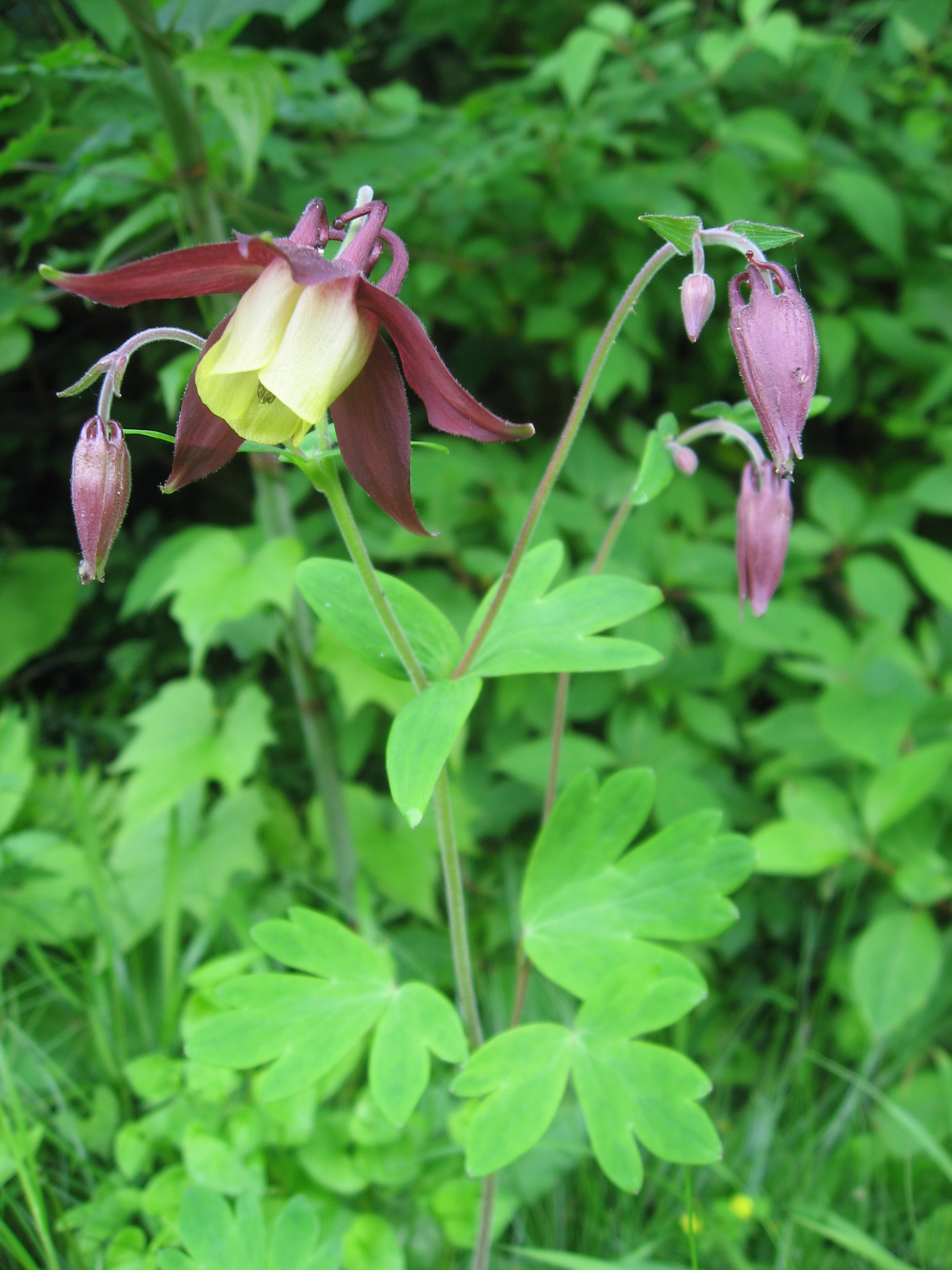

Scientific classification
- Kingdom: Plantae
- Clade: Embryophytes
- Clade: Tracheophytes
- Clade: Angiosperms
- Clade: Eudicots
- Order: Ranunculales
- Family: Ranunculaceae
- Genus: Aquilegia
- Species: A. oxysepala

Binomial name
- Aquilegia oxysepala Trautvetter & C.A.Mey.

Synonyms
- List: Aquilegia buergeriana var. oxysepala (Trautv. & C.A.Mey.) Kitam.; Aquilegia vulgaris var. oxysepala (Trautv. & C.A.Mey.) Regel; Aquilegia vulgaris subsp. oxysepala (Trautv. & C.A.Mey.) Brühl; Aquilegia buergeriana f. pallidiflora (Kitag.) Kitag.; Aquilegia buergeriana f. viridialba Sugim.; Aquilegia oxysepala var. pallidiflora Nakai; Aquilegia oxysepala f. pallidiflora Kitag.; Aquilegia vulgaris var. mandshurica Brühl

= Aquilegia oxysepala =

Species of flowering plant

Aquilegia oxysepala is a perennial flowering plant species in the genus Aquilegia (columbine) in the family Ranunculaceae. It is native to East Asia, with a range extending from southeastern Siberia to Japan. It produces purple and yellow flowers that bloom for three weeks in May. The plant has been used medicinally in China for thousands of years, while modern scientific research has determined that its extract has limited antioxidant qualities.

== Description ==
An Aquilegia oxysepala flower

Aquilegia oxysepala is a species of herbaceous, perennial flowering plant in the family Ranunculaceae (buttercups). A. oxysepala plants flower in May with blooms that last three weeks. Columbines possess flowers that generally have five sepals and five petals. Each petal of Aquilegia typically comprises a broad portion protruding forward, known as a blade, and an elongated structure protruding backwards, known as a nectar spur. The spurs contain the nectar of the flower. On A. oxysepala plants, the purple sepals each possess an ovate-lanceolate shape which comes to an acute tip. The sepals range between 20 mm (0.79 in) and 30 mm (1.2 in) in length. Each petal's blade is pale yellow to yellowish white, measuring 10 mm (0.39 in) to 13 mm (0.51 in) long. The nectar spurs are purple and strongly hooked, reaching approximately 20 mm (0.79 in) long.

The morphology of A. oxysepala is substantially similar to that of A. vulgaris. The purple and yellow coloration and acute terminuses of the sepals and staminodes on A. oxysepala are diagnostic in differentiating it from A. vulgaris. The seeds are approximately 2 mm (0.079 in) long with shiny black surfaces. Aquilegia species generally demonstrate a significant degree of interfertility, permitting hybridization. However, research had determined that A. oxysepala and the fellow Asian columbine A. viridiflora do not hybridize with North American Aquilegia.

Polyphenols, primarily flavonoids, are the main component of hydroethanolic extract from A. oxysepala. These compounds function as antioxidants. A study of A. oxysepala extract found it has a good scavenging effect on DPPH, superoxide anion, and hydroxyl radicals, but a poor scavenging capacity towards hydrogen peroxide. For all these, ascorbic acid has a superior scavenging effect to the extract.

== Taxonomy ==
Aquilegia oxysepala was first described and given its binomial name in 1856 by the German–Russian botanists Ernst Rudolf von Trautvetter and Carl Anton von Meyer. The type locality is described as "Udskoi", located in eastern Siberia. The specific name oxysepala translates from Greek to "acute sepals" or "sharp sepals".

== Distribution ==
Aquilegia oxysepala is native to East Asia, with a range extending from southeastern Siberia to Japan. The species prefers temperate biomes. It is found on the edges of forests and on grassy slopes at elevations between 400 m (1,300 ft) and 2,700 m (8,900 ft) above sea level.

== Uses ==
In China, A. oxysepala has been used as a dietary supplement and medicine for thousands of years. There, A. oxysepala has been used to treat diseases in women such as irregular menstruation and intermenstrual bleeding. While the antioxidant properties of its extract are known, with its medicinal use possibly attributable to the extract's good scavenging of superoxide anion radicals, it is inferior to the common dietary supplement ascorbic acid. Research has also determined A. oxysepala possesses antibacterial qualities.

== Cultivation ==
The American botanist Philip A. Munz reported in 1946 that A. oxysepala was broadly available in cultivation. He recorded that garden specimens of A. oxysepala were sometimes labelled as other species, while Aquilegia buergeriana was sometimes erroneously labelled A. oxysepala var. yabeana.
