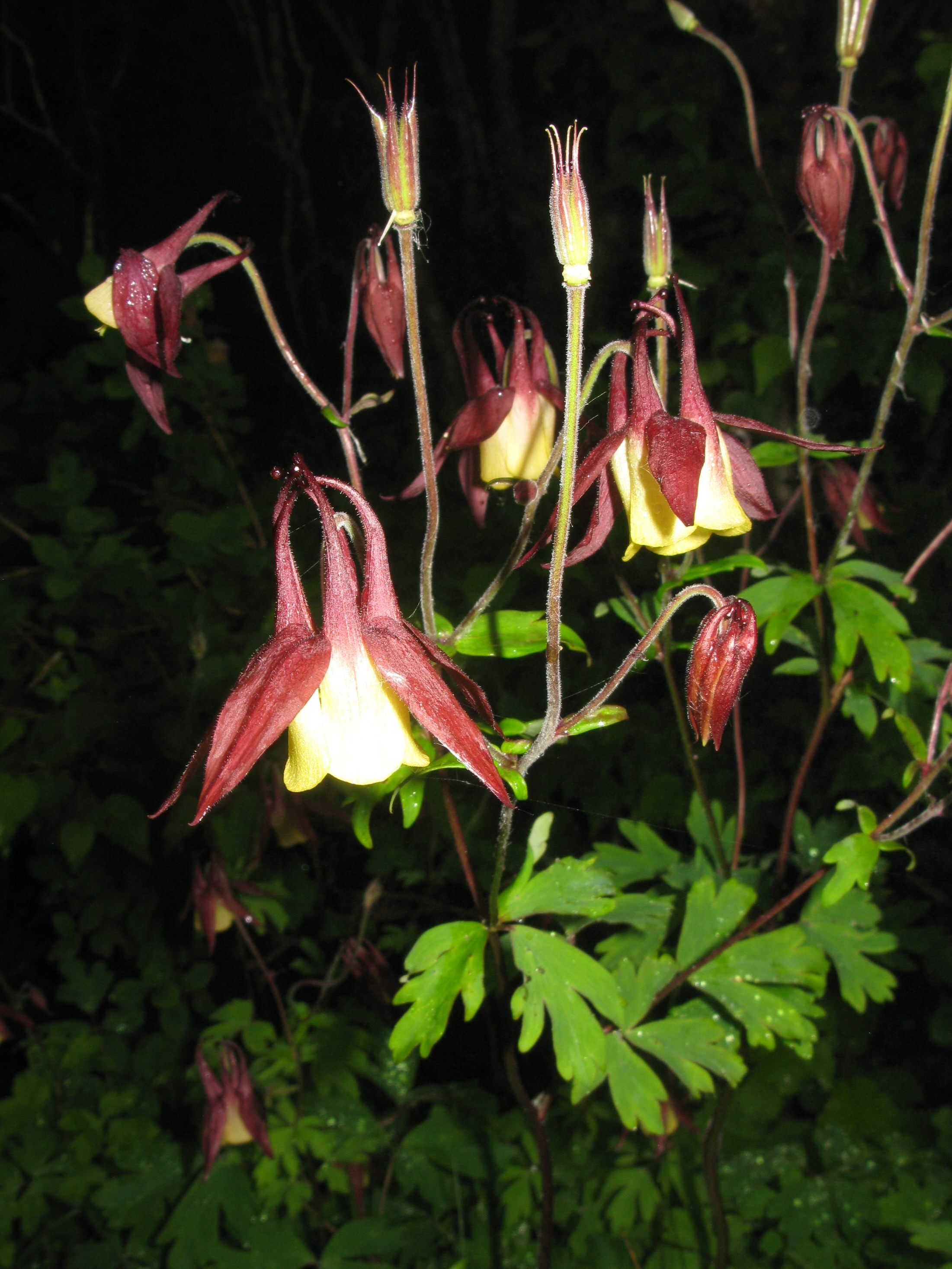

Scientific classification
- Kingdom: Plantae
- Clade: Embryophytes
- Clade: Tracheophytes
- Clade: Angiosperms
- Clade: Eudicots
- Order: Ranunculales
- Family: Ranunculaceae
- Genus: Aquilegia
- Species: A. buergeriana

Binomial name
- Aquilegia buergeriana Siebold & Zucc.

Synonyms
- List: Aquilegia atropurpurea Miq.; Aquilegia buergeriana var. ecalcarata Makino; Aquilegia buergeriana f. ecalcarata Kitam.; Aquilegia buergeriana f. ecalcaratolanceolata K.Asano; Aquilegia buergeriana f. flavescens Makino

= Aquilegia buergeriana =

Species of flowering plant

Aquilegia buergeriana is a perennial species of flowering plant in the family Ranunculaceae, native to Japan.

== Description ==
The species grows to 55–98 cm (22–39 in) in height. It has downward-facing flowers with yellow inner petals, dusky reddish-purple or yellow outer petals, and long spurs measuring 3–4 cm (1.2–1.6 in). The anthers and pistils do not protrude beyond the inner petals.

=== Phytochemistry ===
The leaf, roots, and stem all contain the sugar xylose.

== Taxonomy ==
Aquilegia buergeriana is mostly closely related to the other native Japanese columbine, Aquilegia oxysepala, from which it probably diverged in the late Pleistocene era.

=== Etymology ===
The specific name honours Heinrich Bürger, a plant collector in Japan.

== Distribution and habitat ==
The species is endemic to the islands of Honshu, Shikoku, and Kyushu in Japan, growing in forest edges in mountainous areas.

== Ecology ==
Aquilegia buergeriana flowers from July to September. It is pollinated by the bumblebees Bombus consobrinus, Bombus diversus, and Bombus honshuensis, and occasionally also visited by small carpenter bees, which are likely too small to contribute to pollination. Unlike other species of Aquilegia with yellow petals, it is not visited by hawkmoths. The length of the flower spurs in individual populations is strongly correlated with the typical size of the bees that visit that population.

Populations of the species may contain both red- and yellow-flowered individuals. This variation does not appear to contribute to genetic isolation, probably because, unlike hummingbirds and hawkmoths, bumblebees do not display a preference for Aquilegia individuals of a certain colour.

The leaves are known to be attacked by the fungi Erysiphe aquilegiae var. aquilegiae (causing powdery mildew) and Puccinia actaeae-elymi (forming pustules), as well as the oomycete Peronospora aquilegiicola.
