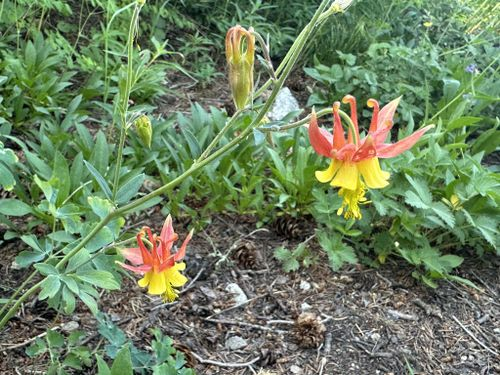
- Aquilegia x miniana growing in Idaho

Conservation status
- Apparently Secure (NatureServe)

Scientific classification
- Kingdom: Plantae
- Clade: Tracheophytes
- Clade: Angiosperms
- Clade: Eudicots
- Order: Ranunculales
- Family: Ranunculaceae
- Genus: Aquilegia
- Species: A. × miniana

Binomial name
- Aquilegia × miniana (J.F.Macbr. & Payson) Cronk

Synonyms
- Aquilegia flavescens var. miniana J.F.Macbr. & Payson

= Aquilegia × miniana =

Species of flowering plant

Aquilegia × miniana is a perennial flowering plant in the family Ranunculaceae, native to British Columbia and Idaho. It is a natural hybrid of Aquilegia flavescens and Aquilegia formosa.

== Description ==
Aquilegia × miniana is a perennial herbaceous plant very similar to A. flavescens except for its sepals, which are salmon-coloured or flushed with pink. The exact dimensions of the plant vary according to the relative proportions of each parent species in its ancestry, but in the holotype the petals measure 6 mm by 6 mm (as compared with 8 mm for A. flavescens and 4 mm for A. formosa), and the anthers extend well beyond the petals at 10 mm (as is typical of A. formosa at 12–15 mm (0.5–0.6 in), but not of A. flavescens at 5–8 mm).

== Taxonomy ==
Aquilegia × miniana is a natural hybrid of Aquilegia flavescens and Aquilegia formosa, growing where the ranges of these two species overlap.

=== Taxonomical history ===
The plant was first discovered in the summer of 1916 by the American botanists James Francis Macbride and Edwin Blake Payson in the mountains of south-central Idaho, and described as a variety miniana of Aquilegia flavescens, distinguished by its sepals being salmon-coloured or flushed with pink. They collected the type specimen on 19 July 1916 on the banks of Challis Creek in Custer County, Idaho, and further specimens in Idaho near the ghost town of Bonanza in the same county, in the Smoky Mountains in Blaine County, and in the Sawtooth Range. Macbride and Payson recognised the hybrid origin of the plant in their description, noting that there existed intermediate forms of A. flavescens and A. formosa where their ranges overlapped, as is the case in central Idaho.

In 2020, the botanists Quentin Cronk and Jeffrey S. Groh demonstrated that the type population was at least partly of hybrid origin, but introgressed towards A. flavescens, with the influence of each parent species varying proportionally according to the habitat and elevation. Following further analysis, Cronk then raised the taxon to the rank of species in 2023.

=== Etymology ===
The specific epithet miniana most likely derives from the mineral minium or red lead, referring to the reddish colour of the sepals.

== Distribution and habitat ==
Aquilegia × miniana is native to British Columbia and Idaho. It grows where the ranges of its parent species overlap: for A. flavescens, subalpine and alpine meadows; and for A. formosa, forest margins and light forest shade from sea level to montane forests. A. × miniana grows at altitudes between 1,620–2,700 m (5,310–8,860 ft).

== Conservation ==
As of January 2025, NatureServe listed Aquilegia flavescens var. miniana (as "miniata") as Apparently Secure Variety (T4) worldwide. This status was last reviewed on 11 September 1996. The species has not been assessed for the IUCN Red List.
