= 1063 Aquilegia =

Asteroid

Discovery
- Discovered by: K. Reinmuth
- Discovery site: Heidelberg Obs.
- Discovery date: 6 December 1925

Designations
- Pronunciation: /ækwɪˈliːdʒ(i)ə/
- Named after: Aquilegia (flowering plant)
- Alternative designations: 1925 XA · 1948 EP; 1956 SK · A906 KA; A910 NC · A920 GB; A923 CA
- Minor planet category: main-belt · (inner); Flora · background

Orbital characteristics
- Epoch 4 September 2017 (JD 2458000.5)
- Uncertainty parameter 0
- Observation arc: 111.49 yr (40,722 days)
- Aphelion: 2.4058 AU
- Perihelion: 2.2223 AU
- Semi-major axis: 2.3141 AU
- Eccentricity: 0.0396
- Orbital period (sidereal): 3.52 yr (1,286 days)
- Mean anomaly: 243.41°
- Mean motion: 0° 16^{m} 48^{s} / day
- Inclination: 5.9729°
- Longitude of ascending node: 95.327°
- Argument of perihelion: 107.54°

Physical characteristics
- Dimensions: 11.288±0.540 km 17.32±3.18 km 17.75±1.2 km 18.93±0.37 km
- Synodic rotation period: 5.79 h 5.792±0.001 h
- Geometric albedo: 0.139±0.006; 0.1572±0.023; 0.19±0.10; 0.389±0.042
- Spectral type: X B–V = 0.850; U–B = 0.360
- Absolute magnitude (H): 11.04±0.30 · 11.32 · 11.38 · 11.51

1063 Aquilegia, provisional designation 1925 XA, is a background asteroid from the inner regions of the asteroid belt, approximately 17 kilometers in diameter. It was discovered on 6 December 1925, by German astronomer Karl Reinmuth at the Heidelberg Observatory in southwest Germany. The asteroid was named after the flowering plant Aquilegia (columbine).

== Orbit and classification ==
Aquilegia is a non-family background asteroid when applying the hierarchical clustering method to its proper orbital elements. Based on more generic considerations, it has also been classified as a member of the Flora family (402), a giant asteroid family and the largest family of stony asteroids in the main-belt.

It orbits the Sun in the inner asteroid belt at a distance of 2.2–2.4 AU once every 3 years and 6 months (1,286 days; semi-major axis of 2.31 AU). Its orbit has an eccentricity of 0.04 and an inclination of 6° with respect to the ecliptic.

First observed as A906 KA at Heidelberg in May 1906, the body's observation arc begins with a precovery taken in July 1907, more than 18 years prior to its official discovery observation.

== Physical characteristics ==
Aquilegia has been characterized as an X-type asteroid by Pan-STARRS' photometric survey, which indicates that it is indeed a background asteroid rather than a member of the stony Flora family.

=== Rotation period ===
In February 2004, a rotational lightcurve of Aquilegia was obtained from photometric observations by French amateur astronomer Laurent Bernasconi. Lightcurve analysis gave a well-defined rotation period of 5.792 hours with a high brightness variation of 0.75 magnitude (U=3), indicative for a non-spherical shape. Previous observations by Richard Binzel in May 1984 gave a similar period of 5.79 hours and an amplitude of 0.93 magnitude (U=2).

=== Diameter and albedo ===
According to the surveys carried out by the Infrared Astronomical Satellite IRAS, the Japanese Akari satellite and the NEOWISE mission of NASA's Wide-field Infrared Survey Explorer, Aquilegia measures between 11.288 and 18.93 kilometers in diameter and its surface has an albedo between 0.139 and 0.389.

The Collaborative Asteroid Lightcurve Link adopts the results obtained by IRAS, that is, an albedo of 0.1572 and a diameter of 17.75 kilometers based on an absolute magnitude of 11.38.

== Naming ==
This minor planet was named after a genus of flowering plants of the buttercup family, Aquilegia, which is commonly known as "columbine". The official naming citation was mentioned in The Names of the Minor Planets by Paul Herget in 1955 (H 101).

=== Reinmuth's flowers ===
Due to his many discoveries, Karl Reinmuth submitted a large list of 66 newly named asteroids in the early 1930s. The list covered his discoveries with numbers between (1009) and (1200). This list also contained a sequence of 28 asteroids, starting with 1054 Forsytia, that were all named after plants, in particular flowering plants (also see list of minor planets named after animals and plants).
