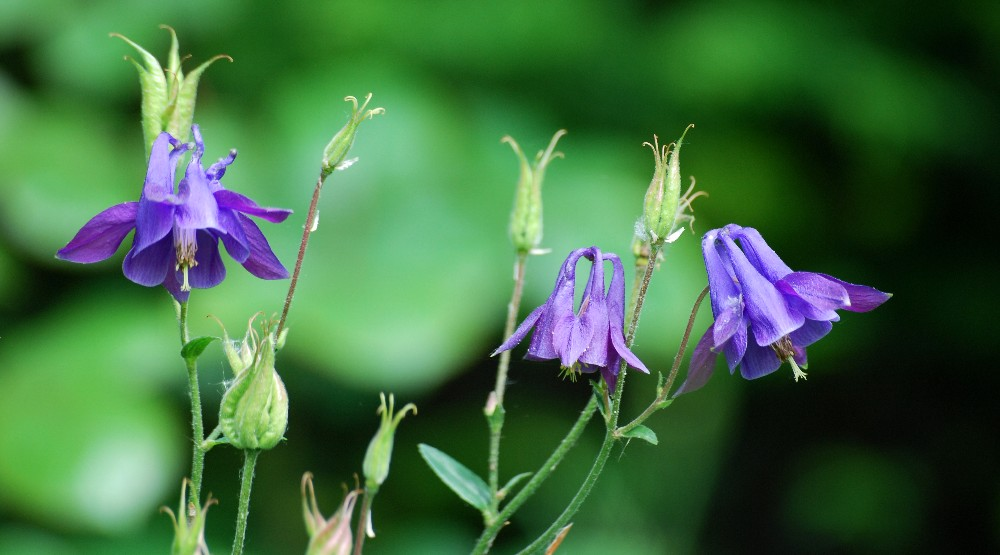
- Aquilegia vulgaris

Scientific classification
- Kingdom: Plantae
- Clade: Tracheophytes
- Clade: Angiosperms
- Clade: Eudicots
- Order: Ranunculales
- Family: Ranunculaceae
- Subfamily: Thalictroideae
- Genus: Aquilegia; L.

Type species
- Aquilegia vulgaris L.

Species
- Approx. 130, see list

Synonyms
- Aquilina Bubani, nom. illeg.

= Aquilegia =

Columbine

Genus of flowering plants

Aquilegia, commonly known as columbines, is a genus of perennial flowering plants in subfamily Thalictroideae of the family Ranunculaceae (buttercups). The genus includes between 70 and 400 taxa (described species and subspecies) with natural ranges across the Northern Hemisphere. Natural and introduced populations of Aquilegia exist on all continents but Antarctica. Known for their high physical variability and ease of hybridization, columbines are popular garden plants and have created many cultivated varieties.

Aquilegia plants typically possess stiff stems and leaves that divide into multiple leaflets. Columbines often have colorful flowers with five sepals and five petals. The petals generally feature nectar spurs which differ in length between species. In North America, morphological variations in spurs evolved to suit different pollinators. Some species and varieties of columbines are naturally spurless. In cultivation, varieties bearing significantly altered physical traits such as double flowering are prevalent.

Columbines were associated with fertility goddesses in ancient Greek and ancient Roman religion, and connected to Christian religious concepts. Archeological evidence suggests Aquilegia plants were in cultivation by the 3rd century AD in Roman Britain, and they remain popular in gardens worldwide. Despite often being toxic, columbines have been in use by humans as herbal remedies, perfume, and food. Asian traditional medicine practitioners, Indigenous North Americans, and Medieval Europeans have considered portions of the plants to have medicinal uses. Selective breeding and hybridization of columbines has occurred for centuries, with genetic exchanges between Old and New World species creating further diversity.

== Etymology ==
The 1st-century AD Greek writer Dioscorides referred to columbine plants as Isopyrum, a name that is now applied to another genus, Isopyrum. In the 12th century, the abbess and polymath Hildegard of Bingen referred to the plants as agleya – from which the genus's name in German, Akelei, derives. The first use of aquilegia with regard to columbines was in the 13th century by Albertus Magnus. In the 16th and 17th centuries, the names Colombina, Aquilina, and Aquileia came into use. With the Swedish biologist Carl Linnaeus's 1753 Species Plantarum, the formal name for the genus became Aquilegia, though limited use of Aquilina persisted in scientific usage until at least 1901.

Several scientific and common names for the genus Aquilegia derive from its appearance. The genus name Aquilegia may come from the Latin word for eagle, aquila, in reference to the petals' resemblance to eagle talons. Another possible etymology for Aquilegia is a derivation from the Latin aquam legere ('to collect water'), aquilegium (a container of water), or aquilex ('dowser' or 'water-finder') in reference to the profusion of nectar in the spurs. The most common English-language name, columbine, is founded in the dove-like appearance of the sepals and derived from the Italian colombino and French colombin, which were in turn derived from columba, Latin for dove.

There are a number of other common names for Aquilegia across different languages. In English, these include granny's bonnet for various species, but particularly Aquilegia vulgaris. An older common name for columbines is lion's herb, from the folk belief that lions fed on it for courage. In French, the word ancolie is the common name for Aquilegia, while individual members of the genus have been called gants-de-Notre-Dame ('Our Lady's glove'). In Italian, amor-nascoto ('love-born') has been used.

== Description ==
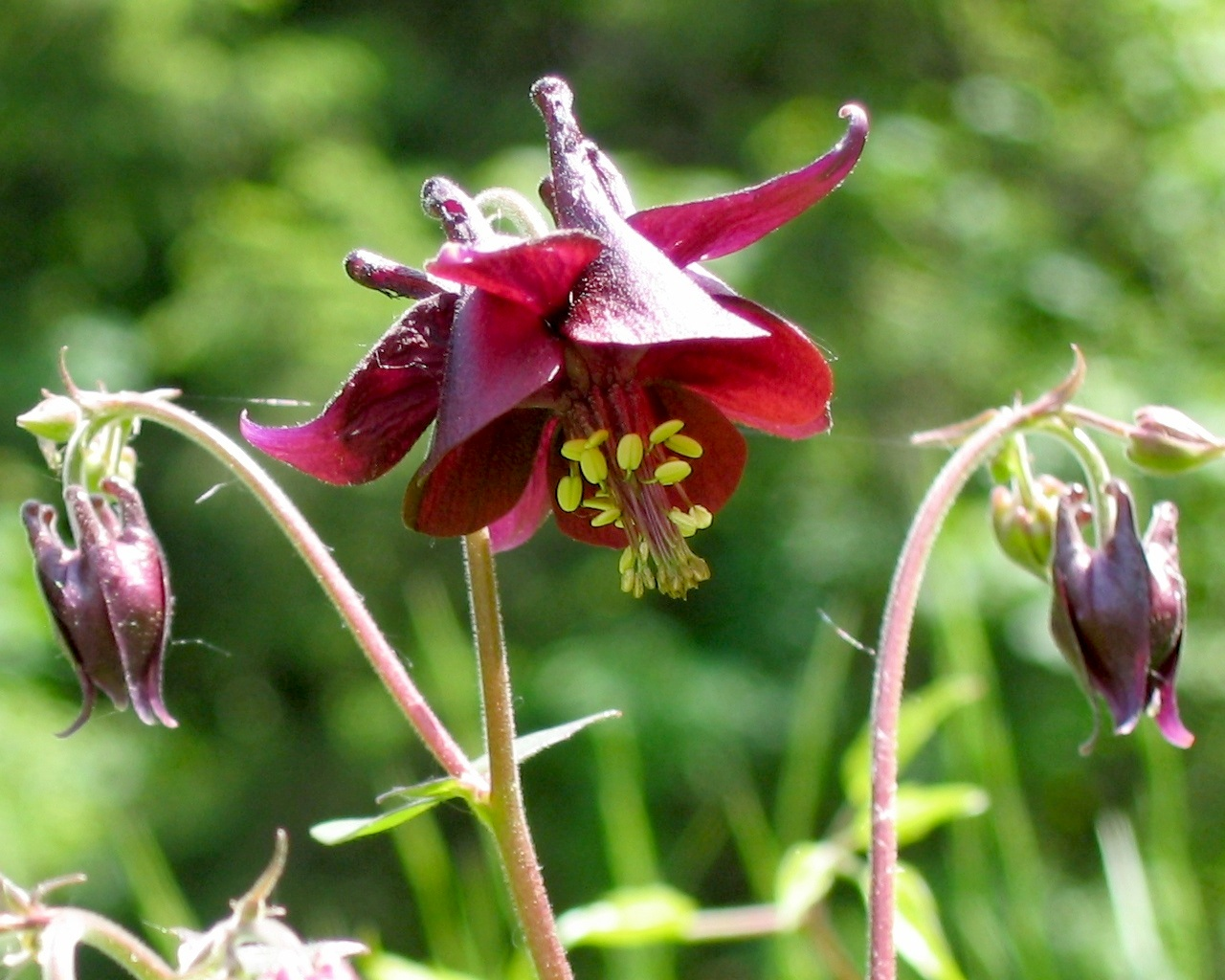
A. atrata flowers

Aquilegia is a genus of herbaceous, perennial flowering plants in the family Ranunculaceae (buttercups). The genus is highly variable in appearance. Though they are perennials, certain species are short-lived, with some exhibiting lifespans more similar to biennials and others only flourishing for three to six years. Following a dormant period in the winter, columbines will grow foliage and have a brief flowering period. Some columbines bloom the first year after sowing, others will first bloom in their second year. Later, seed heads will emerge and split, sowing new seed. The foliage lives through the summer before wilting and dying going into the fall.

Aquilegia plants grow from slim, woody rootstocks that comprise the perennial portion of the plants. One or more annual aerial stems rise from the rootstocks each growing season, ultimately drying out following fruiting. Leaves can grow in both basal (from where the plant meets the soil) and cauline (from an aerial stem) arrangements. Leaves emanating from closer to the plant's core are generally borne on flexible petioles, while leaves further from the core generally lack petioles. The compound leaves of Aquilegia are generally ternate, biternate, or triternate. Ternate leaves each divide into three leaflets, biternate leaves divide into three components that each in turn bear three leaflets for a total of nine leaflets, and triternate leaves divide into three components three times for a total of 27 leaflets.

The flowering stems emerge from rosettes during the spring and summer. Each inflorescence appears at the terminus of an aerial stem and can reach 30 cm (12 in) long. Depending on the species, an inflorescence will feature one to ten of either cymes (flower clusters) or solitary flowers. Flower morphology varies across the genus, but all columbine flowers emerge from buds that are initially nodding (facing downward). Flowers can be monochromatic or display multiple colors. The typical flower color for columbines is blue in shades ranging into purple and nearly black shades. Blue flowering is especially the norm in European columbines, where only A. aurea possesses yellow flowers. In North America, yellow and red flowers are typical, with blue and blue-purple flowers almost exclusive to high-altitude species.

The perianth (non-reproductive portion) on an Aquilegia flower generally comprises five sepals that look like petals and five true petals. Each petal typically comprises two portions: a blade, which is broad and projects towards the front of the flower, and a nectar spur, which is a nectar-bearing structure which projects backward. The hollow spurs attract pollinators and give columbine flowers a distinctive appearance. Some species possess spurs with hooked, horn-like appearances, while other species can have spurs that are either straight or coiled. Some columbines, such as A. ecalcarata, are naturally spurless. Individuals and populations can also be found with recessive spurlessness within typically spurred species.

Aquilegia are bisexual (featuring both male and female organs) and capable of self-pollination, through either or both autogamy (does not require assistance from pollinators) and geitonogamy (requires pollinators). Autogamy has been observed as the primary fertilization mechanism in A. paui. A. formosa and A. eximia may exhibit adichogamy, where male and female organs do not operate simultaneously to prevent self-fertilization. Fertilization via cross-pollination also occurs in Aquilegia, with pollinators carrying pollen from one flower to the stigma of another.

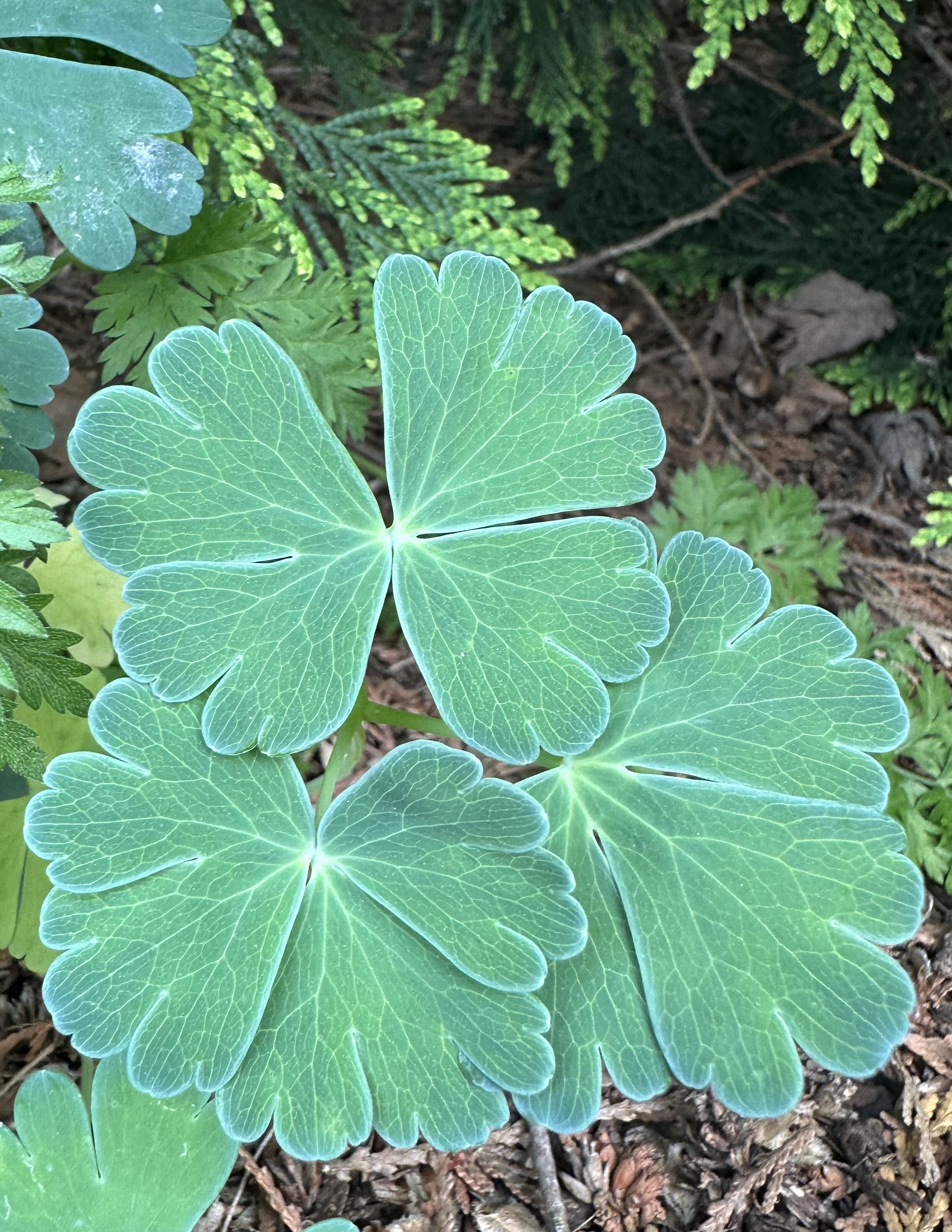
The fanning foliage of A. flabellata 'Alba'

The reproductive portions of a columbine flower comprise the stamen (male) and gynoecium (female). The stamens, which bear the anthers from which pollen emerges, form a whorl of five around the gynoecium. The total number of stamens varies between species. Aquilegia is the only Ranunculaceae genus where each species has its stamens in a whorled arrangement and has syncarpy (fused carpels) in its gynoecium, with this consistency resulting from the presence of nectar spurs. Generally, there are scale-shaped staminodes between the stamen and female pistil structures. Aquilegia are protandrous, meaning that a flower's anthers release its pollen prior to the flower's stigmas being receptive to pollen. The flowers undergo three stages of anthesis: a premale stage, where the flower perianth is open but the anthers are not dehiscenced (split to expose pollen); the male stage with the perianth present and the anthers dehiscenced, and a postmale stage where the anthers have withered but the perianth remains.

Aquilegia fruit comprises follicles. These follicles have a split on one side and terminate with a curling tip known as a beak. Columbine seeds are generally obovoid with black, smooth exteriors. Columbine seeds are in a dormant state at the point of sowing. Aquilegia seeds remain viable longer than many Ranunculaceae, though germination is faster in newer seeds; in cold storage, A. formosa seeds have remained viable for at least three years. Seed germination is primarily dependent on temperature, with seeds typically requiring a multi-month period of summer temperatures followed by a multi-week to multi-month exposure to winter temperatures (vernalization) prior to germinating once temperatures warm with the arrival of spring. This prevents seedlings from emerging until there are survivable environmental conditions.

The chromosome number for columbines is 2n=14 (seven pairs of chromosomes). Individual plants have been recorded with other anomalous chromosome numbers. It is possible that B chromosomes impact the phenotype and the fertility of the individual plants that possess them.

=== Phytochemistry ===
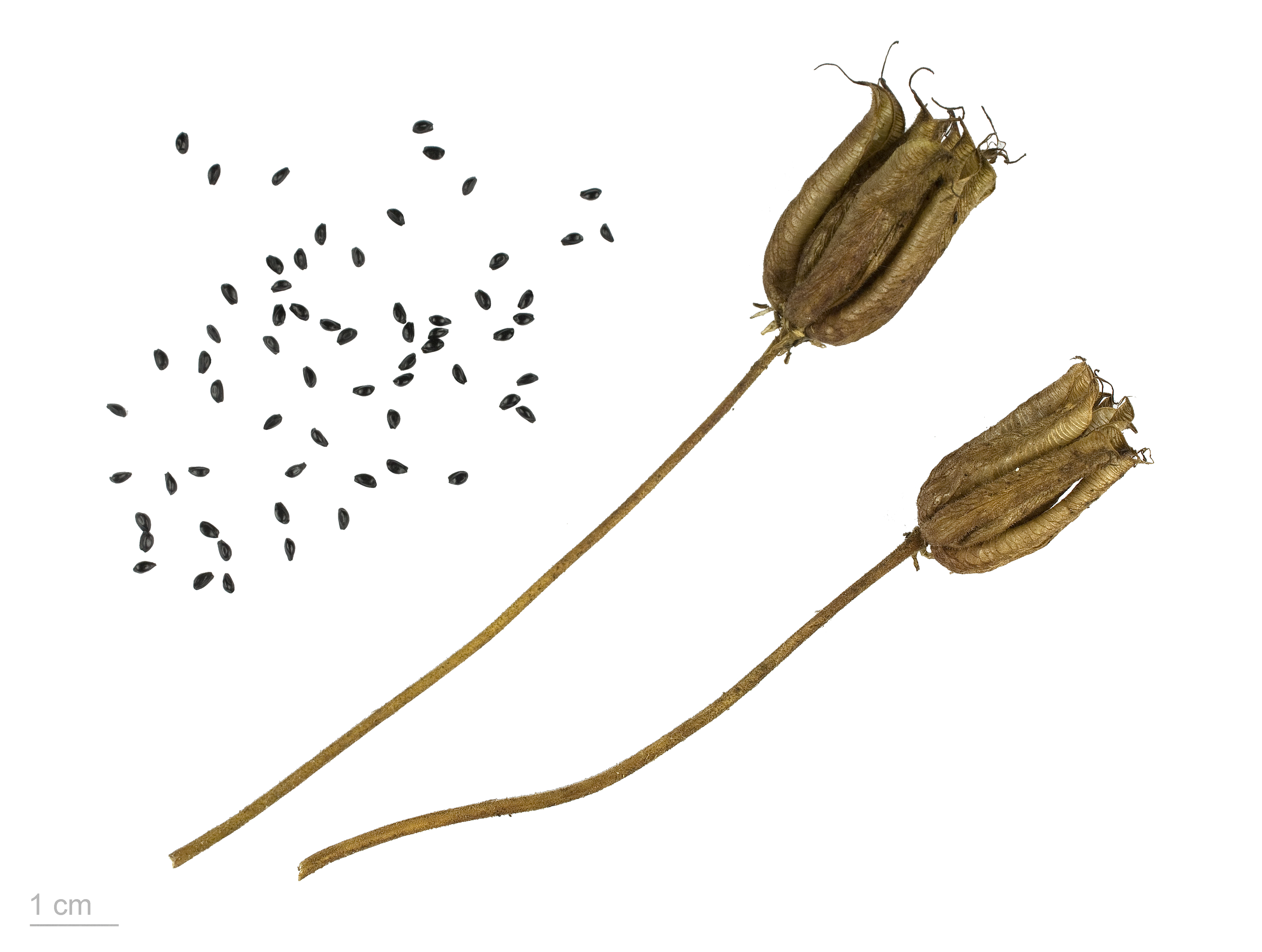
A. vulgaris fruit and seeds. Human consumption of columbine seeds and roots can introduce toxins that impair heart health.

Among Aquilegia that have cyanophores (cells that produce a blue color) like A. vulgaris, the cyanogenic glycosides compounds dhurrin and triglochinin have been observed. Cyanogenic glycosides generally taste bitter and can be toxic to animals and humans. Ingestion of 20 g (0.71 oz) of fresh A. vulgaris leaves by a human was observed to cause convulsions, respiratory distress, and heart failure. A child who consumed 12 A. vulgaris flowers experienced weakness of the limbs, cyanosis, drowsiness, and miosis; all symptoms abated after three hours. Mature seeds and roots contain toxins that, if consumed, are perilous to human heart health.

The presence of the antibacterial flavonoid compound isocytisoside has been observed in A. vulgaris. Polyphenols, primarily flavonoids, are the main component of hydroethanolic extract (produced with a solvent made from a mixture of water and ethanol) from A. oxysepala. These compounds function as antioxidants. A study of A. oxysepala extract found it has a good scavenging effect (a capacity to remove or inactivate undesired substances) on DPPH, superoxide anion, and hydroxyl radicals, but a poor scavenging capacity towards hydrogen peroxide. For all these, ascorbic acid has a superior scavenging effect to the extract.

In flowering plants, the presence of phenylpropanoids can serve as protection from ultraviolet (UV) light and as a signaling mechanism towards pollinators. A study that examined A. formosa flowers determined that the petals and sepals had uniform levels of UV-resistant phenylpropanoids.

== Ecology ==
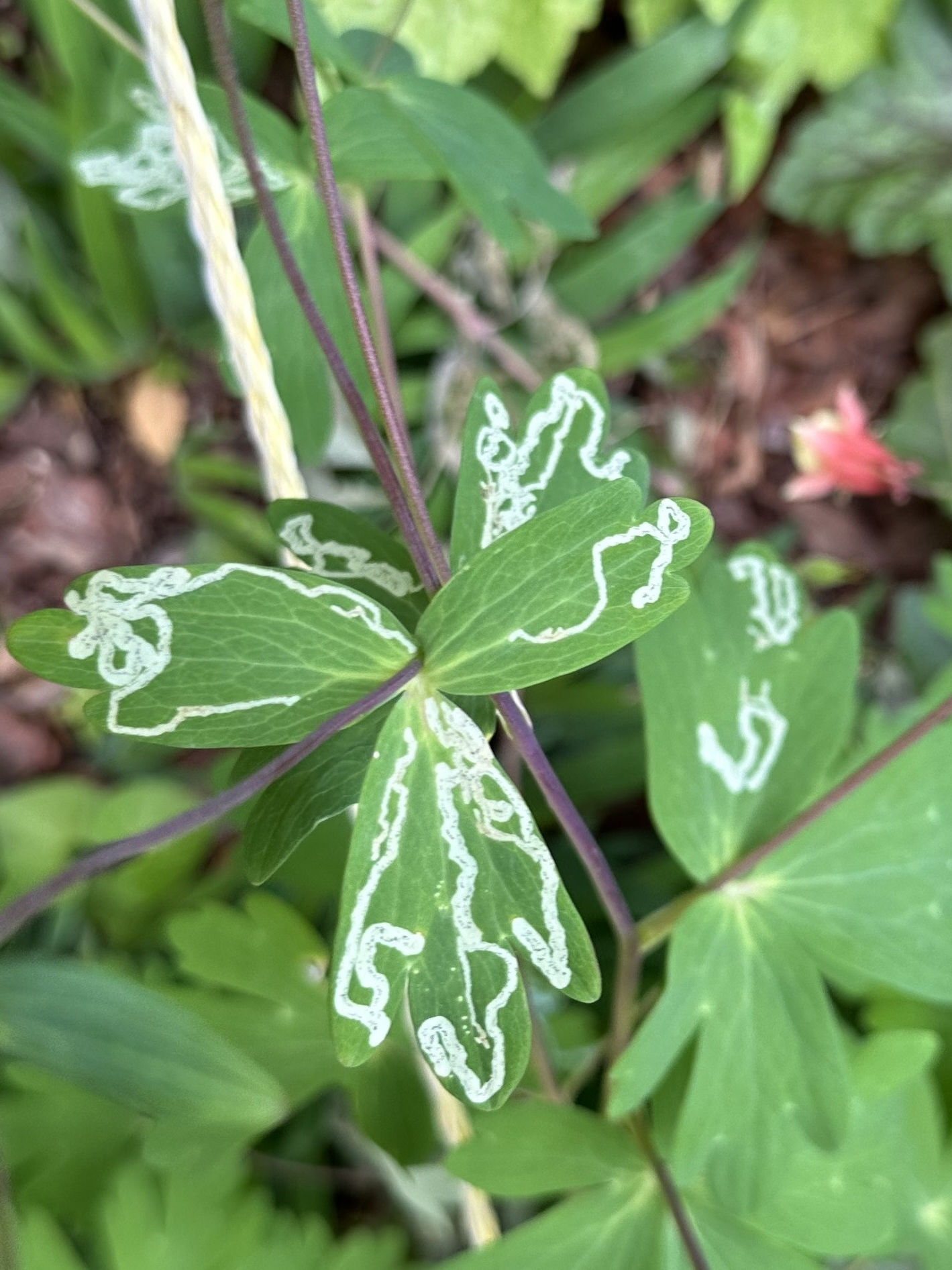
Leaf miners can leave trails where they have consumed the interior tissue of Aquilegia leaves.

Despite the plants' toxicity and in the absence of incentives for human consumption, some animals consume the fruit and leaves of columbines. Consumption by mammals is not considered a component of the Aquilegia reproductive cycle but has been observed. In the case of the endangered A. paui, one study cited a personal observation that 30% of all fruit was lost to goat predation.

In the Northeastern United States and Eastern Canada, A. canadensis serves as the host plant for the butterfly Erynnis lucilius (columbine duskywing). In two periods, the first from April to June and the second from July to September, the butterflies lay their eggs on the underside of the columbine leaves. The latterly laid brood overwinters as caterpillars in the plant litter around the columbine. In the Western United States, Bombus occidentalis (western bumblebee) has been observed nectar robbing from A. coerulea by opening or using holes cut in the spurs.

Also in North America, three leaf miner species in the genus Phytomyza lay their eggs on Aquilegia: P. aquilegiana in the east, P. aquilegivora in the Midwestern United States, and P. columbinae in the west. Collectively known as the columbine leaf miners, white trails or splotches on leaves indicate where the larvae consumed the tissue between the leaves' surfaces. The larvae will cut through the leaves, pupating in small puparia on the leaves' undersides. Adults pierce the leaves with their ovipositors to access liquids in the plants, leaving marks. Another Phytomyza columbine leaf miner, P. ancholiae, is native to France.

Originally from Europe, Pristiphora rufipes (columbine sawfly) is now also found in Canada and the United States. After developing from eggs laid on columbine leaves in late spring, the green larvae will eat the leaves from the outside in during their active period from April to June. In cases where many larvae are on the same plant, only the stem and flowers may go uneaten. The larvae mature within a few weeks, after which they drop from the plants and pupate in cocoons.

Several fungi attack columbine foliage, including Ascochyta aquilegiae, Cercospora aquilegiae, and Septoria aquilegiae. The fungus-like oomycete species Peronospora aquilegiicola, a type of downy mildew, originated in East Asian Aquilegia and Semiaquilegia populations. It was first reported on columbines in the United Kingdom in 2013, resulting in discussion about quarantining measures to prevent its spread to Continental Europe.

=== Pollination ===
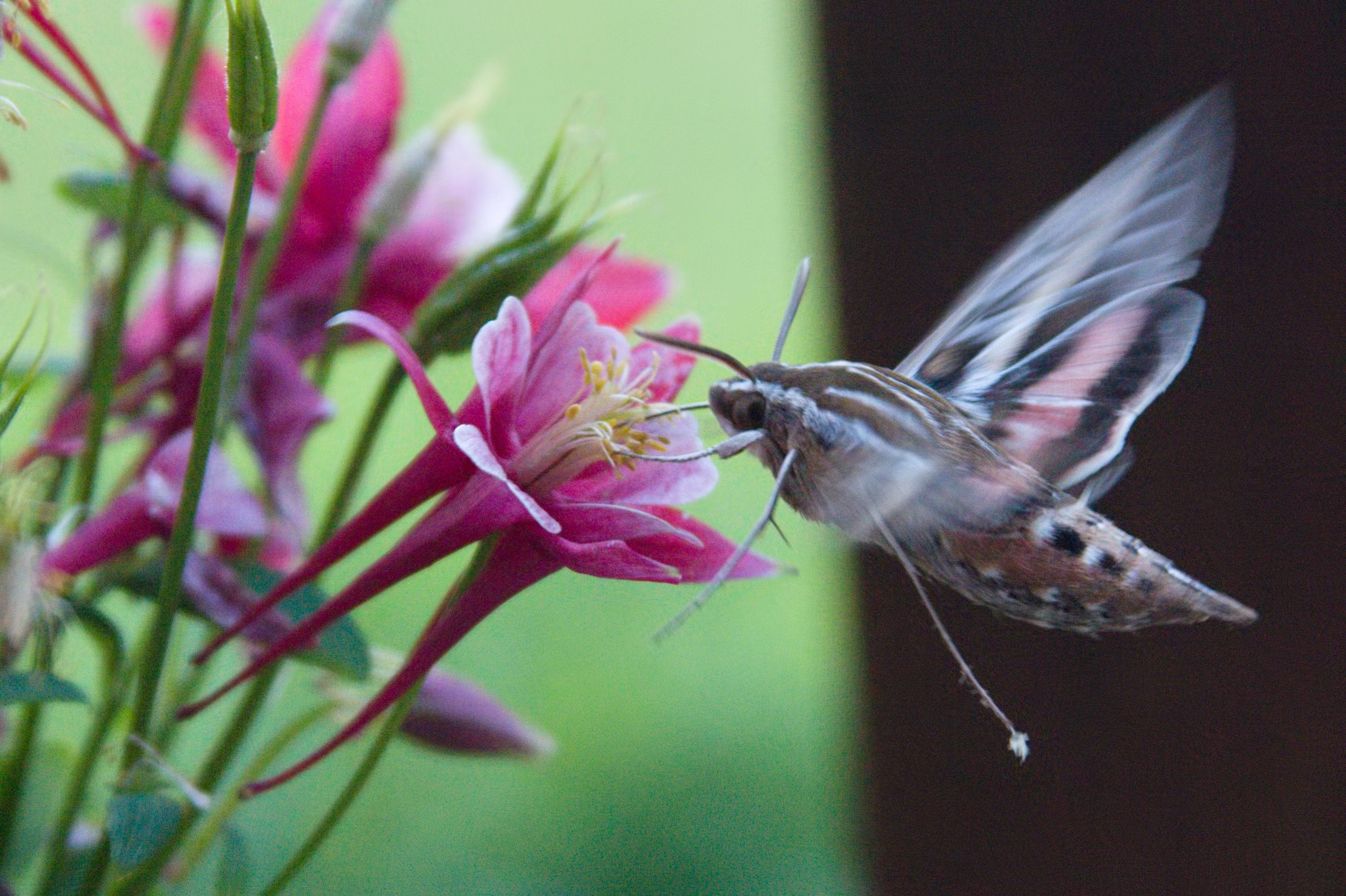
Some North American columbines adapted to pollination by hawkmoths (pictured) and hummingbirds. Longer nectar spurs require nectar-seeking hawkmoths to make contact with the columbine's reproductive organs.

Aquilegia developed diverse floral features including varied orientation, coloration, and nectar spur morphology to attract different pollinators, contributing to speciation. The suite of floral traits that develop to attract a particular set of pollinators are collectively referred to as a flower's pollination syndrome (also called a floral syndrome). Aquilegia flowers are traditionally divided into three pollination syndromes: bumblebees, hummingbirds, or hawkmoths, each of which is attracted by the plants' nectar. In addition to these primary pollinators, pollen-collecting insects frequently function as secondary pollinators among columbines. A 2026-published study determined that pollination syndromes in Aquilegia species were primarily driven by the three sets of nectar-collecting pollinators but found no evidence that secondary, pollen-collecting pollinators imposed any evolutionary pressure on floral traits. In cases where pollinators are scarce, columbines may adopt autogamy as a primary fertilization method, such as in A. paui.

Eurasian columbines are primarily pollinated by flies, bees, and bumblebees. North American columbines are generally pollinated by bees, bumblebees, hawkmoths, and hummingbirds. Pollination by hummingbirds is more typical for red-flowered North American Aquilegia, while pale-flowered columbines may have developed to increase their visibility to hawkmoths in twilight.

Nectar spur length on particular columbines is often correlated to their associated pollinators. While nectar spur length in Eurasia varies little, there is substantial variation in North American spur length. There, hawkmoths often possess long tongues, which permit them to reach deep into nectar spurs. In areas of hawkmoth pollination, the elongated nectar spurs of A. coerulea prevent them from removing nectar without making contact with the pollen. While hawkmoths are present in Eurasia, there are no Eurasian columbines with the hawkmoth pollination syndrome which includes longer spurs. In North America, the presence of hummingbirds – which are absent in Eurasia and possess tongue lengths that are generally intermediate between other pollinators and hawkmoths – may have functioned as a stepping stone that allowed North American Aquilegia to evolve the hawkmoth pollination syndrome.

While a given population of Aquilegia may settle a particular habitat and develop pollination syndromes for certain pollinators, this does not necessarily translate into ecological speciation with genetic barriers between species. The likelihood of such speciation increases when floral mutations and pollinator behavioral changes coincide with isolated, small populations, as in the case of A. micrantha var. mancosana.

== Taxonomy ==
Within Linnaean taxonomy, Aquilegia was first described as a genus in Carl Linnaeus's 1753 Species Plantarum. The genus is typically assigned to the family Ranunculaceae, though a minority of botanists formerly considered it a member of the family Helleboraceae. The latter placement, first made by the French botanist Jean-Louis-Auguste Loiseleur-Deslongchamps in 1819, was premised on Helleboraceae fruiting almost universally occurring with a follicle. Another historic assignment, made by the Swedish botanist Nils Lilja in 1870, placed Aquilegia as the sole member of the family Aquilegiaceae.

Historically, columbines were commonly assigned to the tribe Isopyreae, though they were sometimes placed within Aquilegieae. The placement of the tribe containing Aquilegia was uncertain, with alternating assignments to two subfamilies: Thalictroideae and Isopyroideae, with the latter now considered a synonym of Thalictroideae. Regardless of the placement, Aquilegia and the genera Isopyrum and Thalictrum (meadow-rues) form a basal, paraphyletic group which is characterized by their plesiomorphy (characteristics shared between clades from their last common ancestor) with Berberidaceae.

A 2026 genus-level phylogenetic revision of Ranunculaceae published in the journal Taxon placed Aquilegia within Thalictroideae. This revision also placed all twelve of the subfamily's genera into a single tribe: Thalictreae. When placed within the monophyletic Thalictroideae, Aquilegia is the second largest genus in the subfamily in terms of taxa (described species and subspecies), behind Thalictrum. Columbines are nested in one of the three major clades in the subfamily, a clade it shares with Semiaquilegia and Urophysa. Semiaquilegia and Aquilegia are sister genera.

The broadly accepted circumscription of Aquilegia was established by the American botanist Philip A. Munz in his 1946 monograph Aquilegia: The Cultivated and Wild Columbines. The only element of Munz's circumscription which has been substantially contested is his inclusion of the spurless Asian species A. ecalcarata, which is sometimes instead segregated into the closely related genus of spurless-flowered Semiaquilegia; Semiaquilegia ecalcarata remains the species's common name in cultivation. Another spurless columbine, A. micrantha var. mancosana, was also once reassigned to Semiaquilegia. Reassignments to Isopyrum and Paraquilegia, such as P. anemonoides in 1920, have been more permanent.

=== Evolution ===
Aquilegia

- - - - A. amurensis
      - - A. parviflora
        - A. japonica
    - - A. jonesii
      - - - - A. brevistyla
            - A. canadensis
        - - - - A. scopulorum
              - - A. pubescens
                - - A. eximia
                  - - A. flavescens
                    - A. formosa
            - A. chrysantha
            - - A. longissima
              - A. skinneri
              - - A. elegantula
                - A. coerulea
- - - A. yabeana
    - - A. rockii
      - - A. kansuensis
        - A. ecalcarata
  - - - A. moorcroftiana
      - - - A. nivalis
          - - A. pubiflora
            - A. fragrans
        - A. lactiflora
        - - A. karelinii
          - A. atrovinosa
    - - A. olympica
      - - - A. einseleana
          - A. bertolonii
        - - - A. glandulosa
            - A. sibirica
            - - A. viridiflora
              - - A. buergeriana
                - A. oxysepala
          - - A. alpina
            - A. amaliae
            - A. atrata
            - A. aurea
            - A. barbaricina
            - A. bernardii
            - A. blecicii
            - A. champagnatii
            - A. dinarica
            - A. dumeticola
            - A. grata
            - A. iulia
            - A. litardierei
            - A. kitaibelii
            - A. magellensis
            - A. nigricans
            - A. nugorensis
            - A. nuragica
            - A. pancicii
            - A. pyrenaica
            - A. reuteri
            - A. transsilvanica
            - A. vestinae
            - A. viscosa
            - A. vulgaris

Phylogeny of the genus Aquilegia, based on Fior et al. 2013. Some names used by that study are now considered synonyms; the names accepted by Plants of the World Online for those taxa are used here.

There are no good fossils of columbines and other Thalictroideae that indicate how they evolved and radiated. Genetic evidence published in a 2024 study suggests that the last common ancestor among Thalictroideae lived in East Asia approximately 36 million years ago, during the late Eocene.

A 2018 study of genetic evidence indicated that Aquilegia first appeared during the Upper Miocene approximately 6.9 million years ago. According to this study, the genus split into two clades 4.8 million years ago, with one clade eventually populating North America and the other radiating across Eurasia. The 2024 study found that the divergence between Urophysa, Semiaquilegia, and Aquilegia instead occurred over a relatively short 1 million-year-long period approximately 8 to 9 million years ago. The genus Aquilegia likely originated in the mountainous portions of south-central Siberia.

Studies of Aquilegia genetics indicated that North American Aquilegia species shared their last common ancestor with species from the Asian Far East between 3.84 and 2.99 million years ago. This analysis corresponded with the theory that Aquilegia reached North America via a land bridge over the Bering Strait. While there were several periods after this date range where the Beringian land bridge connected Asia and North America, these occurred when climatic conditions would have prevented Aquilegia migration through the region.

Genetic information suggests that the diversification rates of columbines rapidly increased about 3 million years ago, with indications of two independent radiation events occurring around that time: one in North American columbine populations and the other in European populations. Despite the rapid evolution of substantial physical differences across species, genetic divergence remains minimal. This, combined with the presence of relatively few physiological barriers to hybridization, has resulted in columbines displaying exceptionally high degrees of interfertility.

Among Asian and European columbines, differences in floral morphology and pollinators are lower between species than between North American species. However, there are approximately the same number of Aquilegia species across the three continents. This suggests that pollinator specialization played a dominant role in North American columbine speciation while habitat specialization was the primary driver of Asian and European columbine speciation.

The nectar spurs present in Aquilegia are an unusual evolutionary trait, arising on the ancestor of all Aquilegia approximately 5–7 million years ago. To determine the gene responsible for the trait, a 2020 paper compared spurred Aquilegia taxa against the spurless A. ecalcarata. This research identified a gene named POPOVICH (POP) – for the then-San Antonio Spurs coach Gregg Popovich due to the gene's regulatory role resembling a coach's management of a team – as responsible for cell proliferation during the early stage of spur development. POP, which encodes a C2H2 zinc-finger transcription factor, appeared at higher levels in the petals of the spurred Aquilegia studied than in A. ecalcarata.

=== Current species ===
According to different taxonomic authorities, the genus Aquilegia comprises between 70 and over 400 taxa (including species and subspecies). Some totals correspond more closely with Munz's 1946 total of 67, while Tropicos records over 200 names – both legitimate and illegitimate – for taxa within the genus. As of 2026, the Royal Botanic Gardens, Kew's Plants of the World Online accepts 130 species.

The American gardener Robert Nold attributed the substantial total of named species, subspecies, and varieties to the 19th-century practice of assigning names to even minutely distinct specimens. However, Nold also held that overly broad species could increase the number of varietal names. The Italian botanist Enio Nardi stated that authors assessing Aquilegia as containing fewer than 100 species "either mask or underestimate their splitting into subspecies, many of which were originally described at the species level" and remain accepted as species in taxonomic indices.

The type species of the genus is A. vulgaris, a European columbine with high levels of physical variability. Most European Aquilegia are morphologically similar to A. vulgaris, sometimes to the point where visually discerning them from A. vulgaris is difficult. A. vulgaris is sometimes considered to encompass Iberian and North African columbines that are not accepted as separate species for reasons that Nardi said were founded in "tradition, more cultural than scientific".

=== Natural hybridization ===
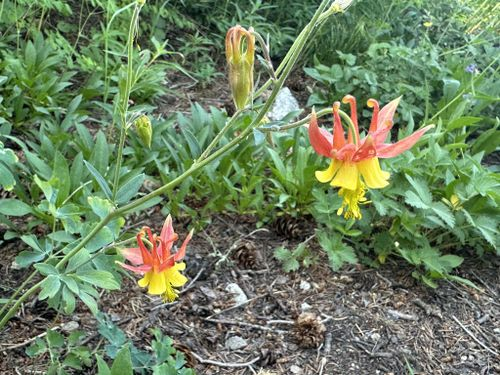
Aquilegia × miniana (pictured) is a naturally occurring hybrid of A. flavescens and A. formosa.

A lack of genetic and physiological barriers permits columbine hybridization across even distantly related species that possess substantial morphological and ecological differences. In natural settings, hybrid columbines may occur wherever the natural ranges of multiple species come into contact.

While artificial pollination has determined the extent of the genus's interfertility, breeding between plants within the same species is generally more common even in settings – both natural and cultivated – where multiple columbine species are present. A significant barrier to hybridization occurring naturally is the proclivity of pollinators to preferentially support infraspecific crossbreeding due to the pollinators' recognition of familiar flower typology.

In North America, species with flowers adapted to hummingbird and hawkmoth pollination have far reduced natural hybridization with species that do not share these adaptations. Still, hybridization and subsequent introgression occurs in North American columbines. Such hybridization across columbines with two different pollination syndromes can be driven by a third pollinator that does not show favoritism towards a particular pollination syndrome. In the instance of populations of hybrids between the yellow-flowered A. flavescens and red-flowered A. formosa in the northwestern United States, the resultant pink-flowering columbines were initially described as an A. flavescens variety and are now accepted as Aquilegia × miniana.

In China, clades distinguishing eastern and western A. ecalcarata populations indicate gene flow from different species. A study using genetic modeling indicated that the spurless A. ecalcarata may have developed from two separate mutations from discrete eastern and western populations of the spurred A. kubanica, an instance of a hybrid parallel evolution. Further hybridization between A. ecalcarata and the spurred columbines that share its range is limited by each species's selection for particular pollinators. However, a short-spurred A. rockii phenotype has developed from hybridization with western A. ecalcarata.

== Distribution ==
Aquilegia species have natural ranges spanning the Northern Hemisphere in Eurasia and North America. These ranges encompass the Circumboreal Region, the geographically largest floristic region in the world. The southern limits of the natural Aquilegia ranges are found in northern Africa and northern Mexico, with the only native African columbine being A. ballii of the Atlas Mountains.

A. vulgaris, a European columbine which possibly originated in the Balkans, has spread through both natural radiation and human assistance to become the most widely distributed Aquilegia species. Its range has expanded to include introduced populations that have sometimes become naturalized in Africa, Macaronesia, the Americas, and Oceania. Naturalized populations of A. vulgaris that originated from gardens are the only columbines observed growing in the wild in Australia, with recorded observations in New South Wales, Victoria, and Tasmania. The species is also present in Asia, with populations in the Russian Far East and Uzbekistan and where they also typically originated from ornamental cultivation.

Some columbines are narrowly endemic, with highly restricted ranges. A. paui only has a single population with four subpopulations within a few kilometers of each other in the Ports de Tortosa-Beseit mountains of Catalonia. A. hinckleyana only natively populates a single location: the basin of Capote Falls, a waterfall in Texas. As of 2005, the entire population of A. nuragica – estimated as 10 to 15 individuals – occupied an area of approximately 50 m^{2} (540 sq ft) on Sardinia.

=== Conservation ===
Certain Aquilegia have been identified as having elevated risks of extinction, with some appearing on the IUCN Red List. Two Sardinian columbines, A. barbaricina and A. nuragica, have conservation statuses assessed by the IUCN as critically endangered and the same organization listed the species in their 2005 Top 50 Mediterranean Island Plants campaign for conservation. Some columbines, including both rare and common taxa, are subject to governmental regulations intended to protect individuals and populations. The conflation of taxa has sometimes resulted in uncertainty regarding their conservation statuses.

Humans pose a significant threat of impairing columbine population health and driving extinction. Beyond the desirability of the flowers for display, uncommon or rare Aquilegia face the risk of destruction by botanists and others seeking to add them to their herbariums or private collections.

== Cultivation ==
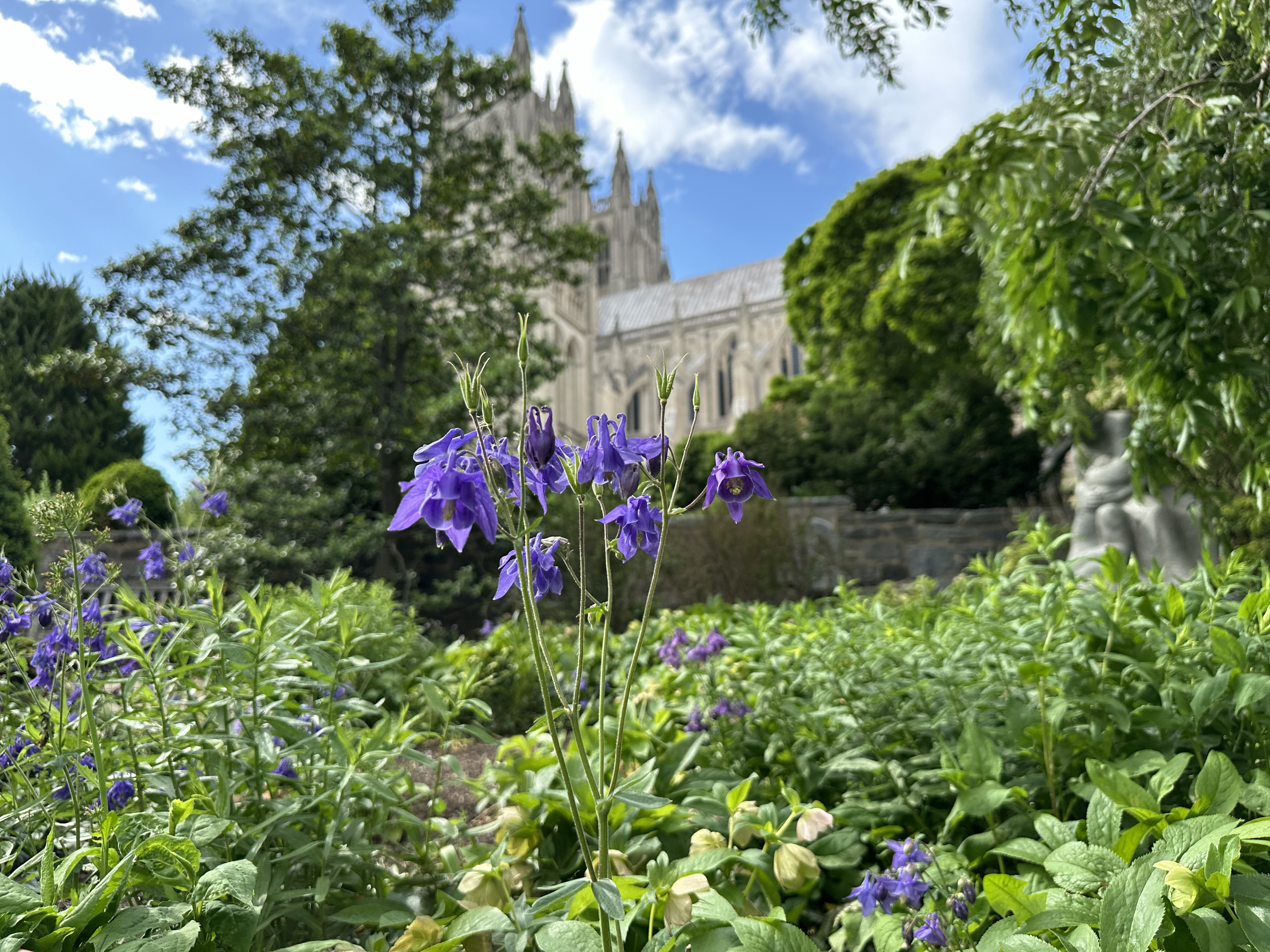
Some of the earliest cultivation of columbines may have occurred at Christian cathedrals.

In Europe, cultivation of columbines may have begun over 1,700 years ago. Archaeobotanical evidence suggests that A. vulgaris was cultivated for ornamental purposes in 3rd-century AD Roman Britain. Two A. vulgaris seeds in burnt waste pits, one at Alcester and another at Leicester, have been interpreted as evidence of their planting in Roman gardens. Finds of columbines at a late Saxon site near Winchester Cathedral and three later medieval German sites may indicate the plants were used for gardening. In 12th-century Italy, people may have supported A. vulgaris or A. atrata populations near religious structures, possibly due to the contemporary treatment of columbines as Christian symbols.

Aquilegia are grown for a variety of purposes. Cut flowers can be collected once the flower opens. The dried fruit can also be used in ornamental arrangements. Columbines function well in garden borders and can occupy shade and cottage gardens. Certain columbines are suited for well-drained rock gardens or alpine gardens. A few, such as the dwarf woodland plant A. flabellata var. pumila, favor moist shaded plantings.

Lifespans for cultivated columbines are generally relatively short for perennials, with a plant's peak typically occurring in its second year. Two- to three-year-long lives are typical in cultivated A. coerulea and A. glandulosa, with A. vulgaris exhibiting a biennial-like lifespan. Conversely, A. chrysantha and A. desertorum are particularly long-lived. In gardens, columbines will generally live three to four years. This lifespan can be extended by deadheading, where dead flowers are removed prior to a plant expending the energy needed to produce fruit.

In cultivation, the seasonal cycle that releases columbine seeds from dormancy can be replicated via a stratification where seeds are exposed to two to four weeks of cool temperatures prior to sowing. Cultivated Aquilegia typically require well-draining soil. Poorly drained soil can result in the development of root rot, caused by either bacteria or fungi. At the end of the growth season, columbines can be protected from frost heaving by having their dead foliage removed to near the soil level and mulching once the ground is frozen. Vernalization – a process by which juvenile plants are exposed to a weeks-long period of cold which mimics seasonal weather – can accelerate the rate at which columbines reach flowering.

If permitted, cultivated columbines drop numerous seeds around themselves, resulting in a rapid proliferation of seedlings. These seedlings can give the impression that short-lived plants are living longer. Due to their tendency towards hybridization and – particularly in the case of F1 hybrids and cultivars (cultivated varieties) – inherent genetic diversity, the seeds of cultivated Aquilegia often do not produce plants true to their type. If identical plants are desired, basal cuttings can be performed in early summer. Propagation by division can be achieved by pulling plants apart in the late winter prior to new growth occurring. Artificial self-pollination can be performed by placing mesh cages around developing flowers to block access by pollinators. Pollen from the anther of a later-opening flower can be brushed onto the stigma of an earlier-opening flower. The cages can then be removed once the fruit begins developing.

Several animals are considered pests of cultivated columbines. Columbine leaf miners of the Phytomyza genus leave white patches or paths on leaves, but the damage is only cosmetic and does not generally require chemical pesticides. The moths Papaipema lysimachiae and P. nebris (stalk borer) both adversely affect columbines; scraping the ground around impacted plants can destroy the moths' eggs. The larval stage of the Erynnis lucilius (columbine duskywing) is known as the columbine skipper, and the larvae can chew leaves and bind them together with silk. Aphid infestation is another frequent issue, requiring rapid intervention to prevent significant destruction.

=== Cultivars and cultivated hybrids ===
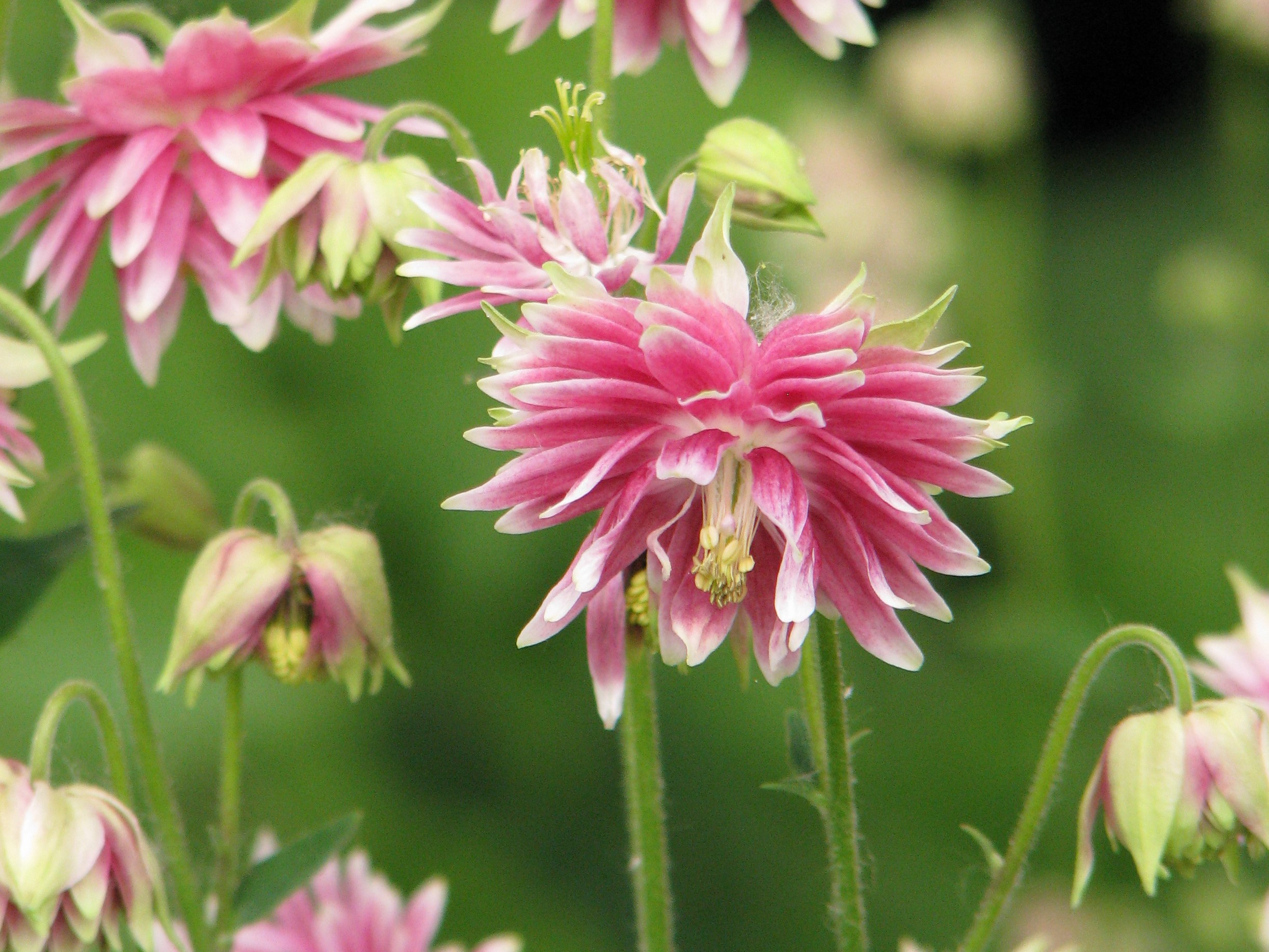
A. vulgaris 'Nora Barlow' is a double-flowered cultivar known for its coloring.

Columbine cultivars are popular among gardeners, particularly in the Northern Hemisphere. The cultivars are frequently bred in series, with plants sharing traits but varying in color. Some series produce dwarf plants. A. vulgaris has been the basis for many cultivars, distinct in foliage, flower shape, and possession of fragrance. The single-flowering A. vulgaris cultivar 'Nivea' (also known as 'Munstead White') received the Royal Horticultural Society's Award of Garden Merit.

Double-flowered columbines were developed from A. vulgaris and can be classified into three types. The Flore Pleno group, described in the English herbalist John Gerard's 1597 book Herball, possesses plants where the flowers are elongated and the petals are rounded. The Vervaeneana group come in several colors of flower and possess marbled green and gold foliage. The Stellata group, described in the English botanist John Parkinson's 1629 book Paradisi in Sole Paradisus Terrestris, has flowers which are star-shaped and have pointed petals. The three-colored, double-flowered cultivar 'Nora Barlow' – first discovered by the botanist and geneticist Nora Barlow – is sometimes classified as part of the Stellata group, but displays a greater quantity of particularly narrow sepals than other members of that group.

Experimental hybridization attempts have determined that the degree of interfertility of columbines is not identical across the genus. While North American columbines easily hybridize with each other and most Eurasian Aquilegia, the Asian species A. oxysepala and A. viridiflora resist hybridization with North American columbines. Hybrids with A. vulgaris as one parent frequently look closer to A. vulgaris than any other parent. Many older garden columbines that are suspected hybrids resemble A. vulgaris, making true parentage difficult to determine. According to the American gardener Robert Nold, "more has been written about 'Hensol Harebell' [a hybrid of A. alpina and A. vulgaris which originated in early 20th-century Scotland] than perhaps any other interspecific hybrid". Nold noted the variety's great affinity to A. vulgaris in appearance.

More recent garden hybridization work has primarily used North American columbines for their greater flower sizes and variety of colors. While columbine flowers often face downward in a nodding arrangement, hybridizers have introduced the A. coerulea trait of upward-facing flowers. The first such hybrids were the McKana Group (also known as McKana's Giants) – which won the 1935 All-America Selections bronze medal for new seed offerings – and Mrs. Scott-Elliot hybrids. However, these large-flowered columbines produced unpredictably colored flowers. Newer F1 hybrids series have larger blooms with greater uniformity in color.

== Human uses ==
=== Medicinal and herbal ===
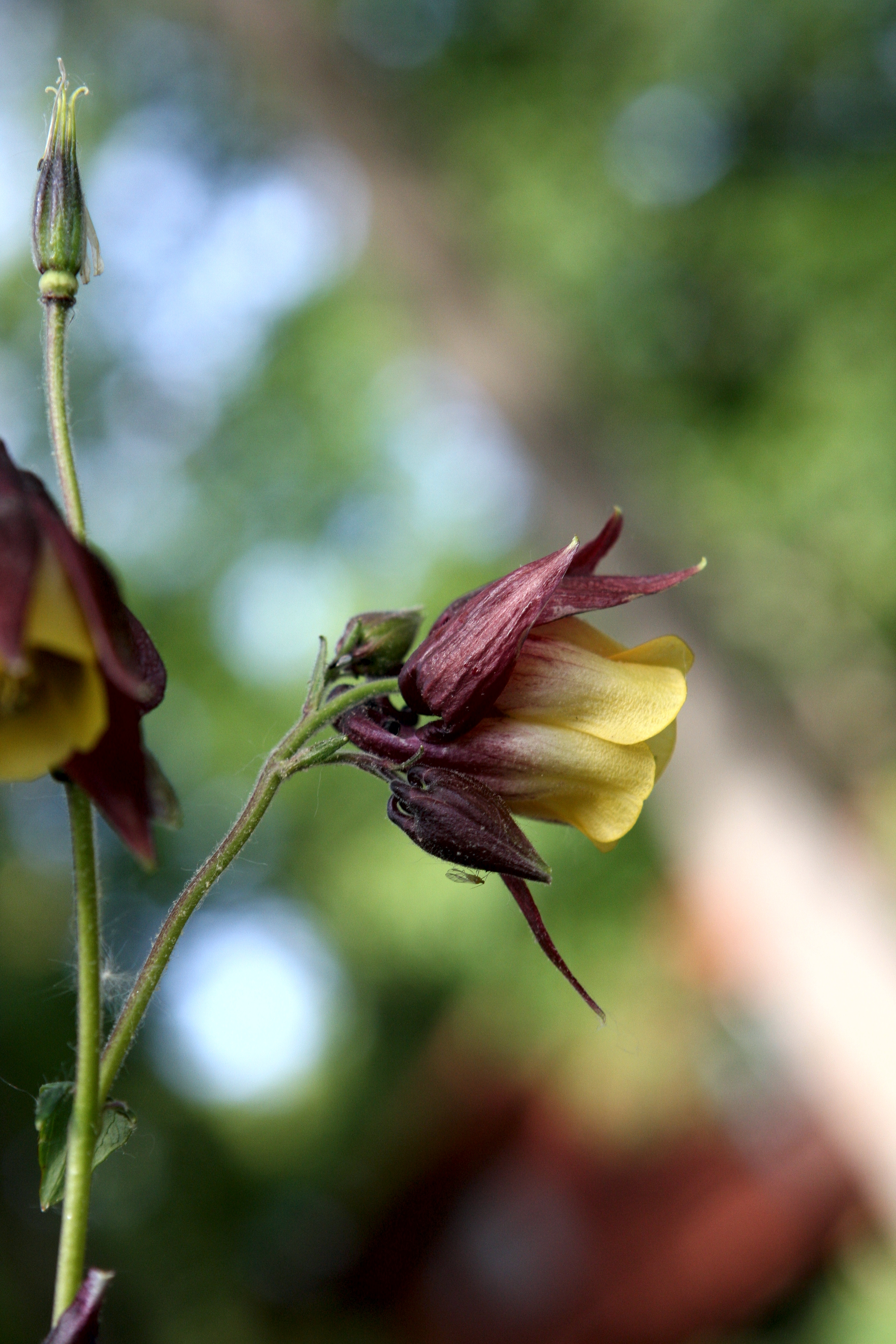
A. oxysepala has been a part of traditional Chinese medicine for thousands of years.

Asian traditional medicine practitioners, Indigenous North Americans, and medieval Europeans have treated columbine plants as medicinal herbs. Modern scientific research has determined that columbines can possess antioxidant, antibacterial, and anti-cancer qualities.

In China, A. oxysepala has been used as a dietary supplement and medicine for thousands of years. A. oxysepala has been used there to treat diseases in women such as irregular menstruation and intermenstrual bleeding. While its extract's function as an antioxidant is known, with its medicinal use possibly attributable to the extract's good scavenging of superoxide anion radicals, it is inferior to the common dietary supplement ascorbic acid. Research has also determined A. oxysepala to possess antibacterial qualities.

A. sibirica has been a significant part of Asian traditional medicine, including traditional Mongolian medicine, and this plant has been used to treat diseases in women, asthma, rheumatism, and cardiovascular diseases. Scientific research has demonstrated the species can inhibit Staphylococcus aureus, one of the bacteria responsible for staphylococcal infections. A. sibirica also possesses antifungal qualities. Extracts showed the presence of chlorogenic acid and caffeic acid, with the former known to inhibit the pathogenic yeast Candida albicans.

Some Indigenous North American peoples used the roots of columbines to treat ulcers. North American peoples have used A. canadensis and A. chaplinei as an aphrodisiac. Crushed A. canadensis seeds were used as a perfume, and the plant was thought to be capable of detecting bewitchment. The Goshute people reportedly chewed A. coerulea seeds or used the plant's root for medicinal or therapeutic purposes.

=== Other uses ===
Before deaths from overdoses were reported, small quantities of flowers from several columbine species were considered safe for human consumption and were regularly eaten as colorful garnishes and parts of salads. Several Indigenous North American peoples have been described as eating A. formosa: the Miwok may have boiled and eaten them with early spring greens, while Hanaksiala and Chehalis children may have sucked nectar from the flowers. Columbine flowers are described as sweet, a flavor attributed to their nectar.

The American botanist Verne Grant repeatedly used Aquilegia in research published between the 1950s and the 1990s to explain the role that hybridization, polyploidy, and other processes played in how plant evolution and speciation occur. Among Grant's works that used Aquilegia to illustrate evolutionary patterns and processes was his influential 1971 book Plant Speciation. The five species groups that Grant proposed in 1952 remain foundational elements for understanding the phylogeny of columbines.

In 21st-century scientific research of plant development, ecology, and evolution, Aquilegia has been considered a model system for studying the relevant mechanisms. Using the genome sequence of A. coerulea, a 2019-published study examined polyploidy during the evolution of eudicots, a clade in which columbines are considered a basal member. This research determined that columbines and all eudicots experienced a shared tetraploidy, but that only core members of the eudicots clade (which excludes columbines) experienced a shared hexaploidy.

== In culture ==
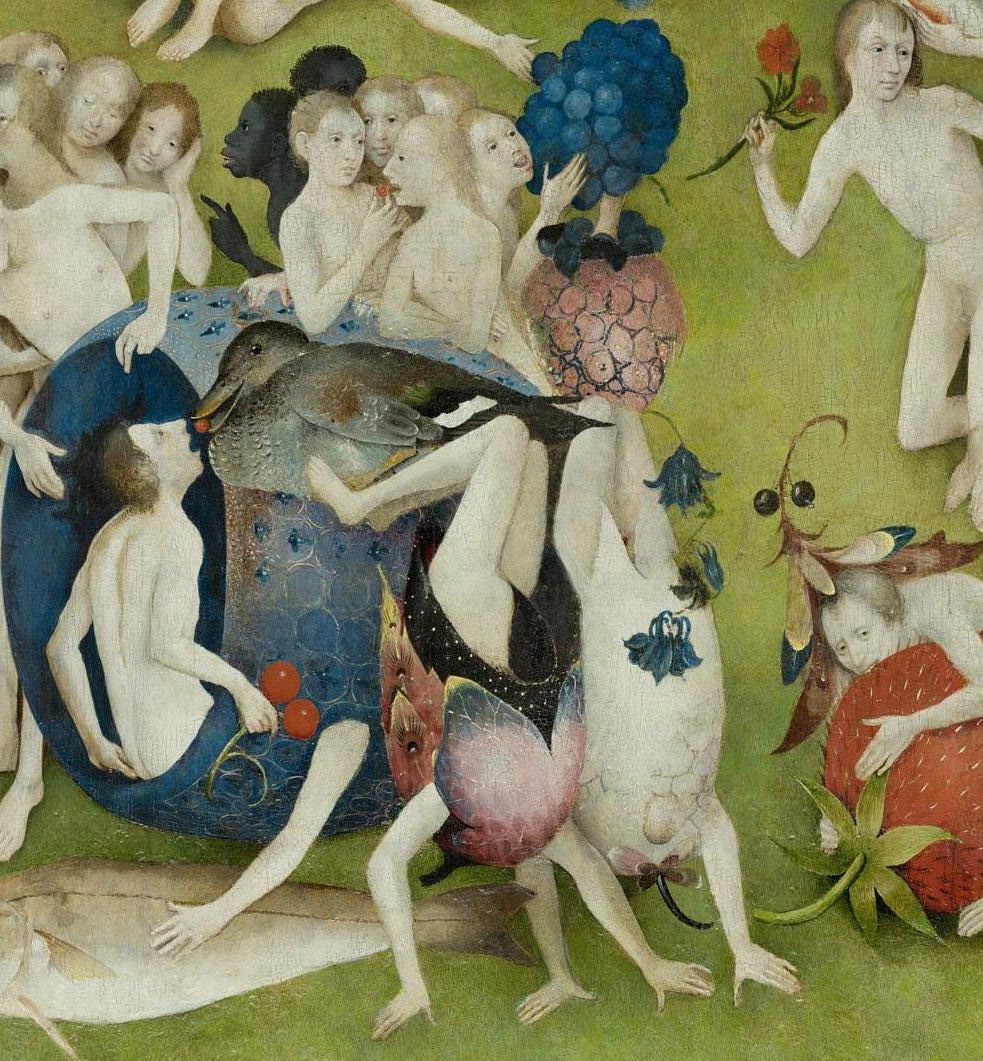
A. vulgaris serves as a symbol of bodily pleasures within Hieronymus Bosch's The Garden of Earthly Delights (detail pictured, with blue columbines in the center).

European columbines have been assigned several meanings since the ancient period. Within art, A. vulgaris has been a symbol of both moral and immoral behaviors, as well as an ornamental motif. In ancient Greece and ancient Rome, the spurs of columbines were interpreted as phallic and the plants were associated with the fertility goddesses Aphrodite and Venus. By the early 17th century, columbines were viewed as symbols of cuckoldry due to their horn-shaped nectar spurs. In English literature, columbines have been mentioned with negative connotations. In Hamlet, an Elizabethan drama by William Shakespeare, Ophelia presents King Claudius with flowers that include columbines, where columbines are symbolic of cuckoldry, deception, and impending death.

Medieval European artists associated columbines with Christian sacredness and sublimity, with Flemish painters of the 15th century frequently depicting them in prominent locations within their Christian artworks. In The Garden of Earthly Delights (c. 1503–1504) by Hieronymus Bosch, A. vulgaris serves as a symbol for bodily pleasures. Portrait of a Princess (1435–1449) by Pisanello depicts multiple A. atrata at different angles as part of the floral ornamentation that makes that painting characteristic of the international Gothic style.

Columbines have several meanings in the language of flowers, a manner of communicating using floral displays. In the 1867 English book The Illustrated Language of Flowers by a "Mrs. L. Burke", columbines are generally described as communicating "folly". The same book identifies purple columbines with "resolve to win" and red columbines with "anxious and trembling". Columbines, due to their resemblance to doves, have been associated with the Holy Spirit in Christianity since at least the 15th century.

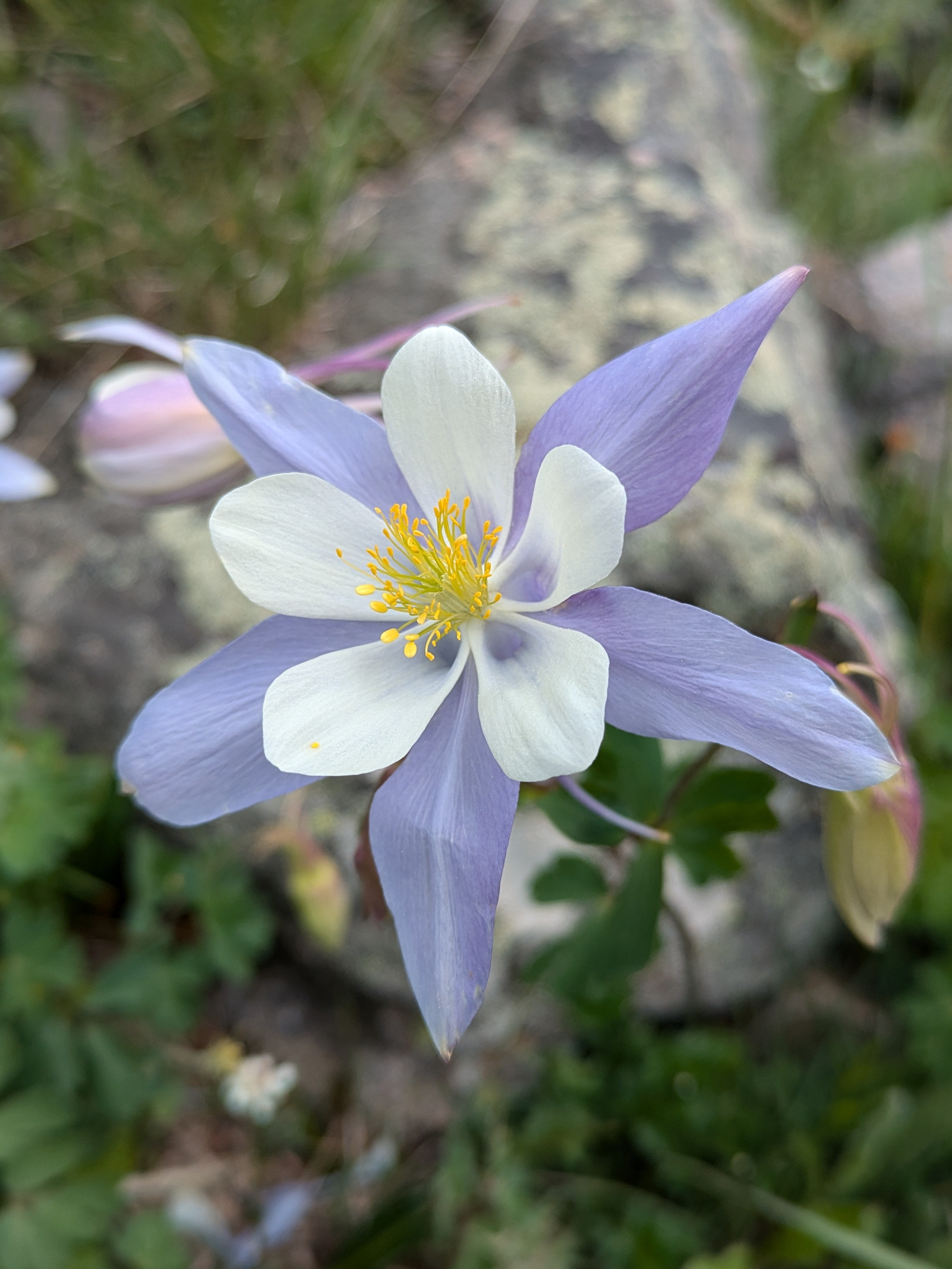
A. coerulea is the state flower of Colorado.

A. coerulea is the state flower of Colorado. The Colorado General Assembly passed legislation in 1925 making it illegal to uproot A. coerulea and putting limits on how many buds, blossoms, and stems may be picked from the species by a person; these restrictions apply only on public lands. The name of the town of Columbine Valley, Colorado, ultimately derives from the state flower. Colorado's A. coerulea also served as the inspiration for one of the state's official songs, "Where the Columbines Grow", written in 1909. Following the 1999 Columbine High School massacre in Columbine, Colorado, the columbine became a symbol of remembrance in Colorado. As of 2023, a specialty license plate depicting a columbine in honor of the victims and survivors of the massacre was the most popular specialty plate in Colorado. A depiction of a blue columbine is also used on road signs denoting Colorado Scenic Byways. The columbine was also used in the heraldry of the former city of Scarborough in the Canadian province of Ontario.

The asteroid 1063 Aquilegia was named for the genus by the German astronomer Karl Reinmuth. He submitted a list of 66 newly named asteroids in the early 1930s, including a sequence of 28 asteroids named after plants, in particular flowering plants.
