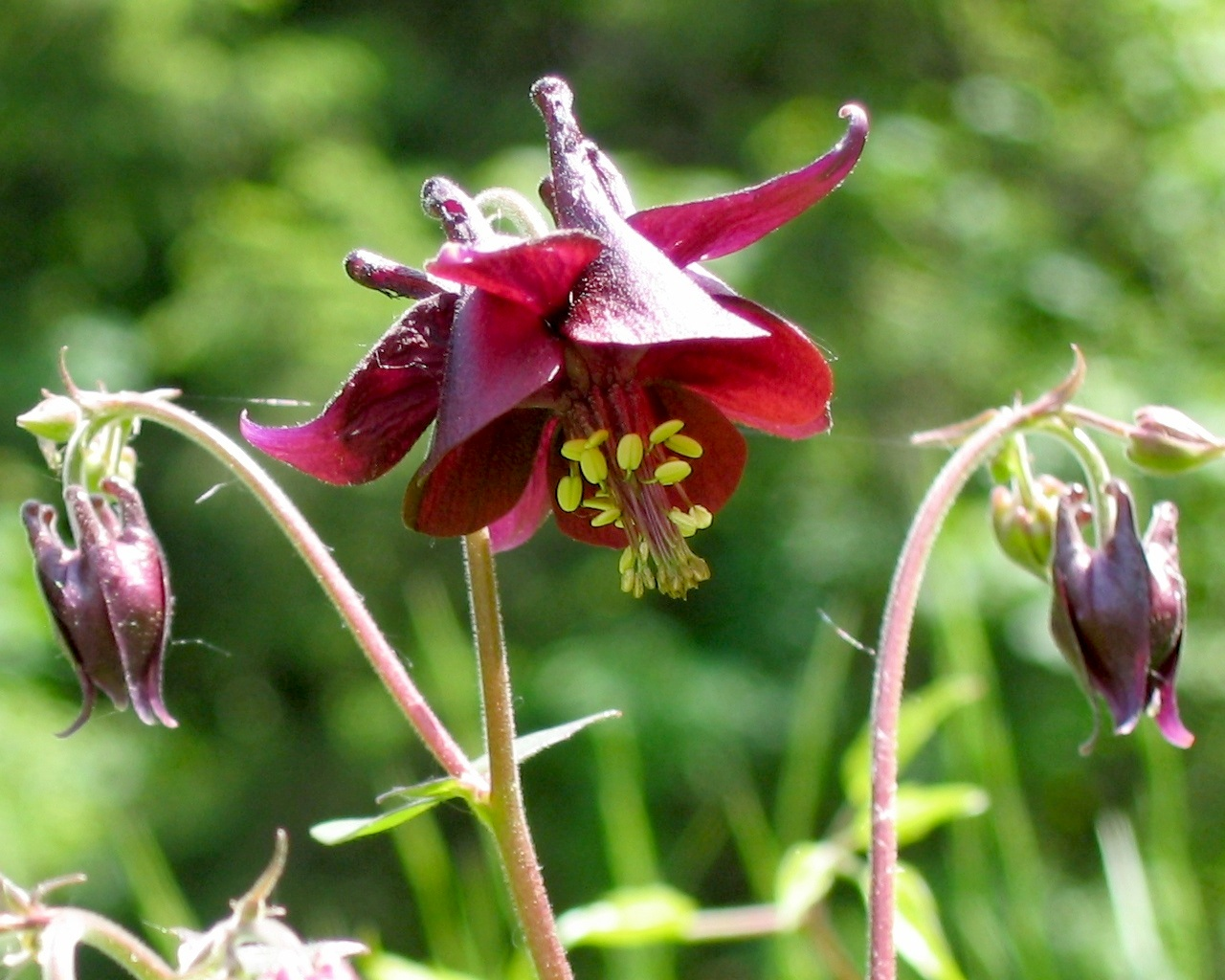

Conservation status
- Not evaluated (IUCN 3.1)

Scientific classification
- Kingdom: Plantae
- Clade: Tracheophytes
- Clade: Angiosperms
- Clade: Eudicots
- Order: Ranunculales
- Family: Ranunculaceae
- Genus: Aquilegia
- Species: A. atrata

Binomial name
- Aquilegia atrata W.D.J.Koch

Synonyms
- List: Aquilegia atroviolacea Beck (nom. superfl.); Aquilegia vulgaris var. atrata (W.D.J.Koch) Baker (nom. illeg.); Aquilegia vulgaris subsp. atrata (W.D.J.Koch) Nyman (nom. illeg.); Aquilegia vulgaris var. nigricans Neilr. (nom. illeg.); Aquilegia atrata var. major Erdner; Aquilegia atrata var. minor Erdner; Aquilegia atrata monstr. nigellastrum Murr; Aquilegia atrata var. salvatoriana (Chenevard) Munz; Aquilegia atrata var. stenosepala Regel; Aquilegia atroviolacea proles salvatoriana (Chenevard) Graebn. & P.Graebn.; Aquilegia vulgaris subsp. atrata Gaudin; Aquilegia vulgaris subsp. atroviolacea (Avé-Lall.) Rapaics; Aquilegia vulgaris var. atroviolacea Avé-Lall.; Aquilegia vulgaris var. cyanescens Borbás ex Hegi; Aquilegia vulgaris f. salvatoriana Chenevard; Aquilegia vulgaris var. salvatoriana (Chenevard) Schinz

= Aquilegia atrata =

Species of flowering plant

Aquilegia atrata, the dark columbine, is a perennial species of flowering plant in the family Ranunculaceae, native to the Alps and Apennine Mountains.

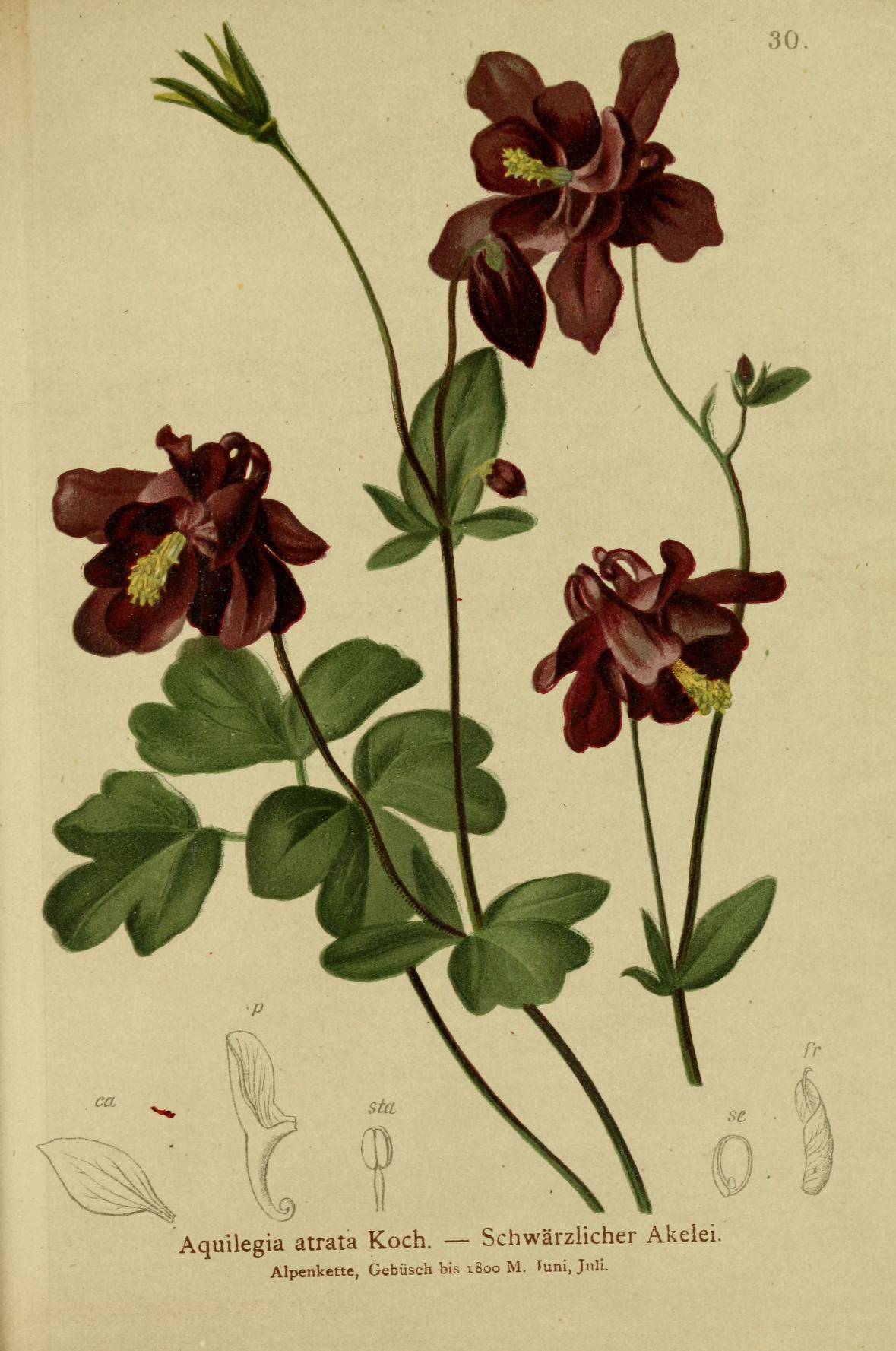
Botanical illustration

== Description ==
As the common name suggests, the species typically, but not always, has dark flowers, either brown, purple or wine-colored. At around 60 cm (24 in) in height, it is smaller than the similar, but more widespread species Aquilegia vulgaris, with stamens protruding further from the flower.

== Taxonomy ==
The specific name atrata is Latin for "blackened" or "darkened", referring to the dark-coloured flowers. It is a currently accepted species in the Aquilegia vulgaris complex, but is not genetically distinguishable from the other members of the complex.

== Distribution and habitat ==
The species is native to mountainous areas of Germany, Switzerland, Liechtenstein, Austria, Slovakia, France, Italy, and Slovenia, and has been introduced to the Czech Republic and Russia (western Siberia). It grows in alpine and subalpine habitats in rocky limestone areas and beech, silver fir, and Scots pine forests.

== Ecology ==
Aquilegia atrata flowers from June to July. The larvae of the columbine sawfly Pristiphora rufipes have been recorded feeding on the plant, as have the leaf miner Phytomyza aquilegiae and the tortrix moth Cnephasia sedana. The leaves are also attacked by the fungi Erysiphe aquilegiae var. aquilegiae (causing powdery mildew), Puccinia scarlensis, and Puccinia agrostidis.

== Conservation ==
Aquilegia atrata has not been evaluated for the IUCN Red List. It is fully protected in the Swiss cantons of Aargau, Appenzell Ausserrhoden, and Obwalden, and partially protected in Bern and St. Gallen.
