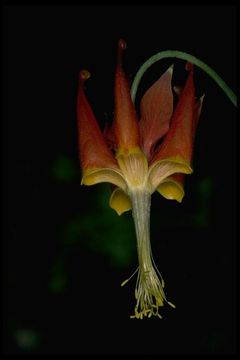
- Flower
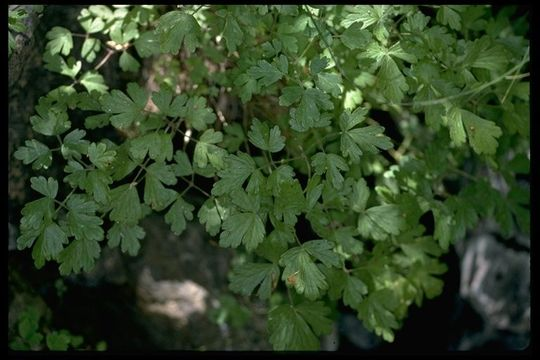
- Foliage

Conservation status
- Vulnerable (NatureServe)

Scientific classification
- Kingdom: Plantae
- Clade: Tracheophytes
- Clade: Angiosperms
- Clade: Eudicots
- Order: Ranunculales
- Family: Ranunculaceae
- Genus: Aquilegia
- Species: A. eximia

Binomial name
- Aquilegia eximia Van Houtte ex Planch.

Synonyms
- Aquilegia adiantoides Greene; Aquilegia fontinalis J.T.Howell; Aquilegia tracyi Jeps.

= Aquilegia eximia =

Californian species of columbine

Aquilegia eximia, the serpentine columbine or Van Houtte's columbine, is a perennial species of flowering plant in the family Ranunculaceae, endemic to California.

== Description ==
Aquilegia eximia is a perennial herb growing from a thick caudex and reaching a maximum height of 20–160 cm (8–63 in). The lower leaves are divided into large, leaflike segments up to 4–5 cm (1.6–2.0 in) long and a lobed oval. Leaves higher up the stem are not segmented, but may be deeply lobed. The inflorescence bears a large, nodding columbine flower. Each flower has five bright red to orange-red flat sepals of 10–28 mm (0.4–1.1 in) in length, and five petals which have hollow spurs 12–35 mm (0.5–1.4 in) long, bright orange-red on the outer surface and lighter orange to yellow inside. The mouth of each hollow petal tube is 6–10 mm (0.24–0.39 in) wide. The sepals and petals are generally reflexed back toward the stem and the five pistils and many thin stamens extend forward from the center of the flower.

== Taxonomy ==
The species is part of a clade containing all the North American species of columbines, that likely split from their closest relatives in East Asia in the mid-Pliocene, approximately 3.84 million years ago.

=== Etymology ===
The specific epithet eximia means "excellent in size or beauty, choice, distinguished" in Latin.

== Distribution and habitat ==
Aquilegia eximia is endemic to the mixed-evergreen or conifer forests of the California Coast Ranges, the western Transverse Ranges, and the San Francisco Bay Area, usually growing on serpentine soils and sometimes in moist ravines at altitudes of 100–1,800 m (330–5,910 ft).

== Ecology ==
The species flowers from May to October and is pollinated by hummingbirds. Its range overlaps with that of Aquilegia formosa, which flowers earlier in the year.

== Conservation ==
As of November 2024, NatureServe listed Aquilegia eximia as Vulnerable (G3). This status is noted as being in need of review, having last been assessed on 2 February 2007.
