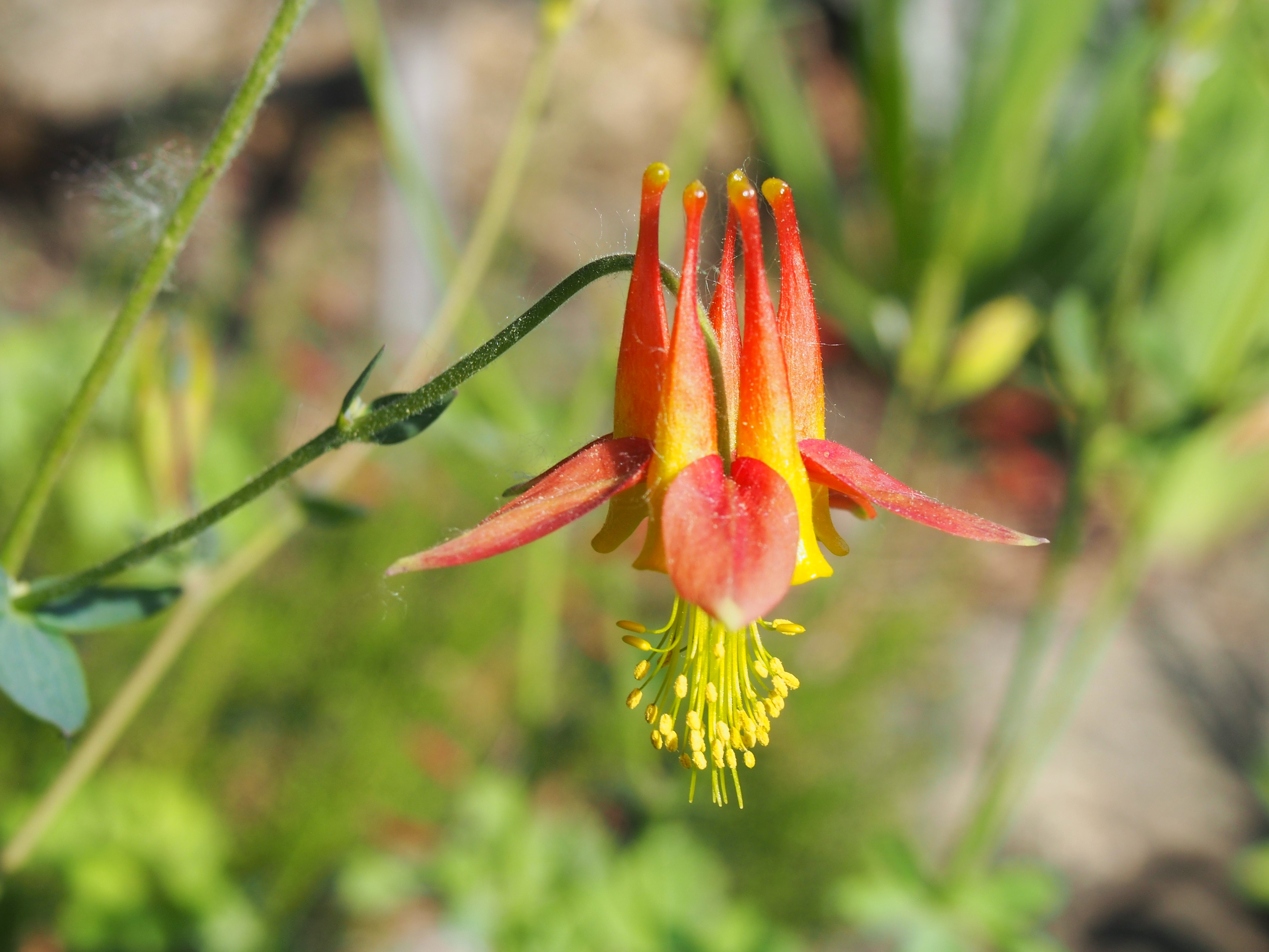
- Flower

Conservation status
- Apparently Secure (NatureServe)

Scientific classification
- Kingdom: Plantae
- Clade: Tracheophytes
- Clade: Angiosperms
- Clade: Eudicots
- Order: Ranunculales
- Family: Ranunculaceae
- Genus: Aquilegia
- Species: A. desertorum

Binomial name
- Aquilegia desertorum (M.E.Jones) Cockerell ex A.Heller

Synonyms
- Aquilegia formosa var. desertorum M.E.Jones; Aquilegia triternata Payson

= Aquilegia desertorum =

North American species of columbine

Aquilegia desertorum, the desert columbine, is a perennial species of flowering plant in the family Ranunculaceae, native to the Southwestern United States.

== Description ==
The desert columbine is a small species growing to 15–30 cm (5.9–11.8 in) in height, and has nodding red flowers with yellow centre petals. The stamens extend beyond the centre petals, and are yellow in colour. The flower spurs are red in colour, broad at the base, and straight. Unlike most other columbine species, it does not have an upright habit.

== Taxonomy ==
Aquilegia desertorum is very close to Aquilegia canadensis and may not be truly distinct at species level. Plants from the eastern and southern parts of its range have sometimes been considered a distinct species, Aquilegia triternata, largely based on their longer sepals and petal blades, but in central Arizona the two varieties become hard to distinguish, and A. triternata is therefore usually considered a synonym of A. desertorum.

=== Etymology ===
The specific epithet desertorum means "of deserts" in Latin.

== Distribution and habitat ==
Aquilegia desertorum is native to New Mexico, Arizona, and southwest Utah. It inhabits open rocky limestone areas at altitudes of 2,000–2,500 m (6,600–8,200 ft), where seepage or other moisture is present.

== Ecology ==
The flowering period is from May to October. The species is primarily pollinated by hummingbirds.

== Conservation ==
As of October 2024, NatureServe listed Aquilegia desertorum as Apparently secure (G4) overall and in Arizona, but Critically Imperiled (S1) in Utah and in the Navajo Nation.

== Uses ==
The Kayenta Navajo used Aquilegia desertorum as an aid in ceremonies.
