= Peronospora aquilegiicola =

Scientific classification
- Domain: Eukaryota
- Clade: Sar
- Clade: Stramenopiles
- Phylum: Oomycota
- Class: Peronosporomycetes
- Order: Peronosporales
- Family: Peronosporaceae
- Genus: Peronospora
- Species: P. aquilegiicola

Binomial name
- Peronospora aquilegiicola Thines, G. Denton & Y.J. Choi

Species of plant pathogen

Peronospora aquilegiicola is a species of oomycete in the family Peronosporaceae, first described in 2019. It is a plant pathogen: it can infect susceptible plants belonging to the genus Aquilegia, causing the plant disease Aquilegia downy mildew, as well as plants belonging to the genus Semiaquilegia (although infected Semiaquilegia plants show few signs of disease). Peronospora aquilegiicola is native to East Asia, however it has a widespread distribution in the United Kingdom (where it was first observed in 2013), and has since been detected in the German states of Lower Saxony, North Rhine-Westphalia, and Bavaria.
