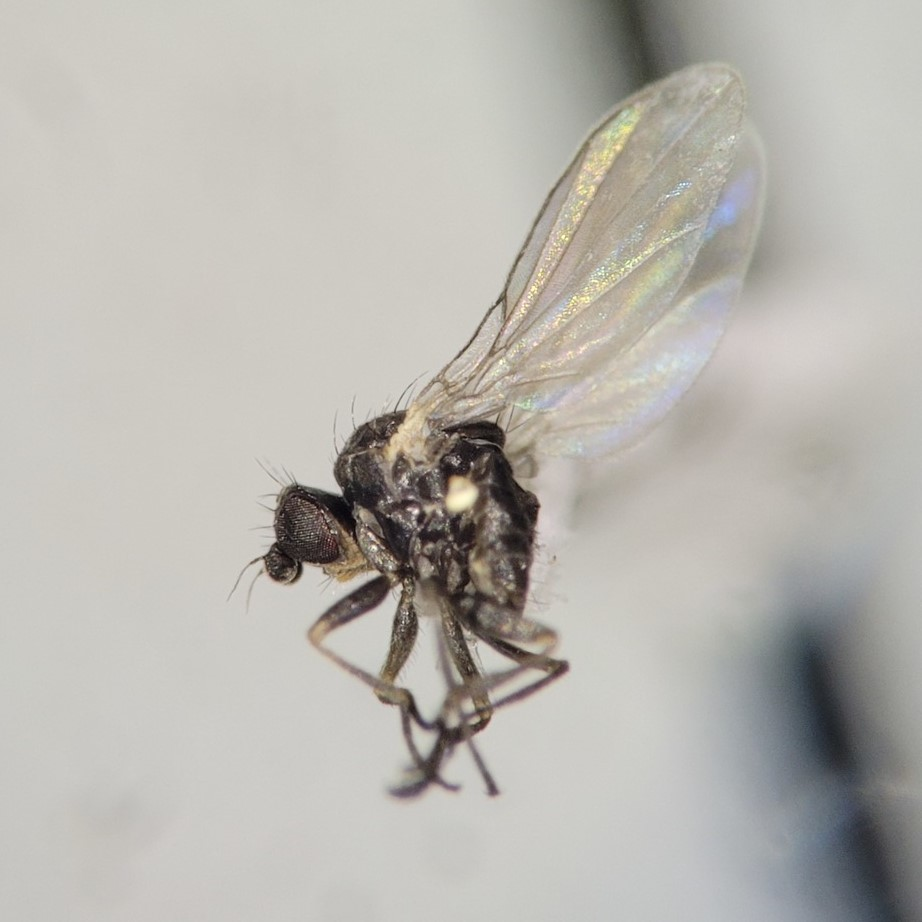

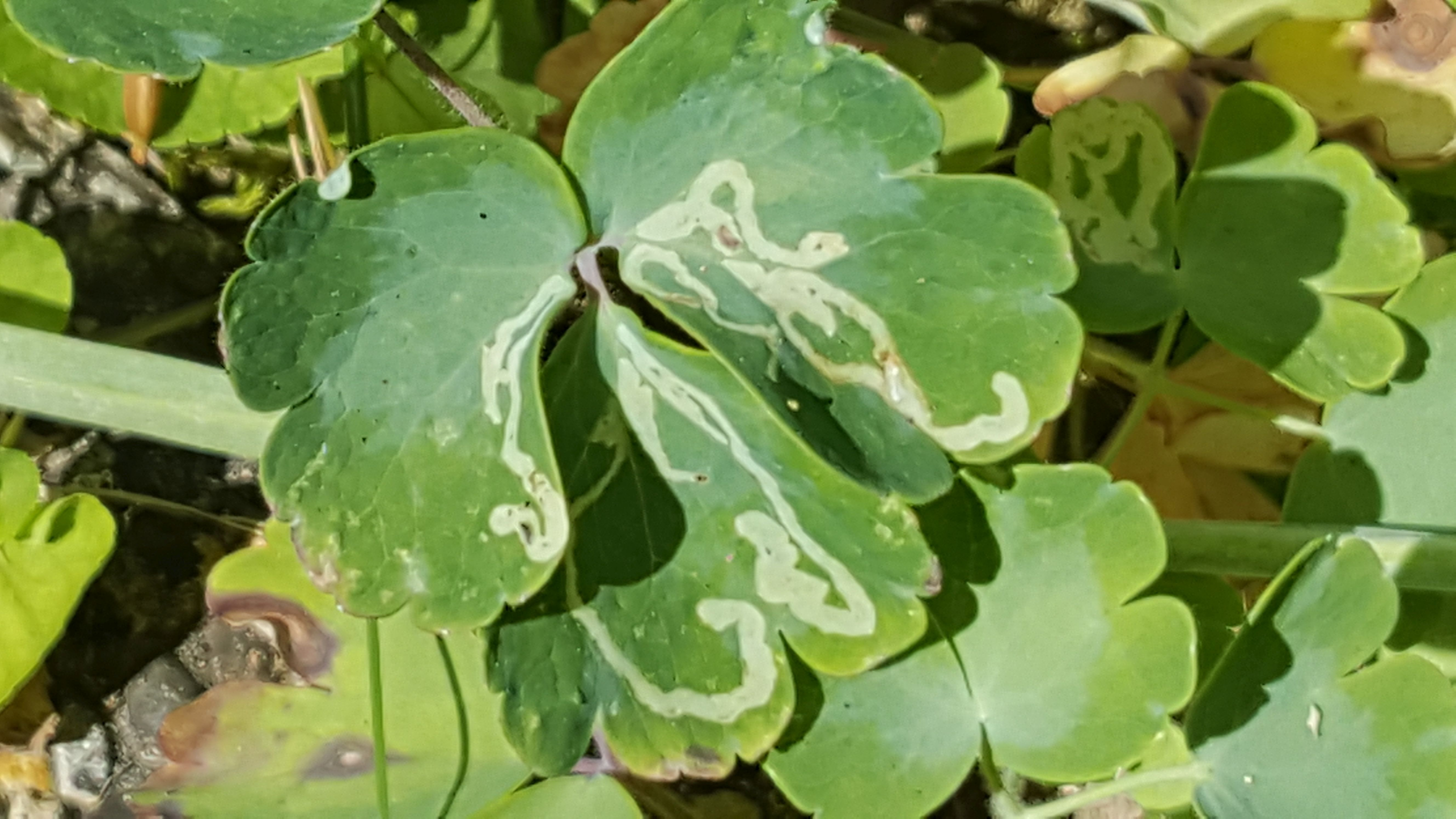
- Adult (top) and leaf mines on Aquilegia vulgaris (bottom)

Scientific classification
- Kingdom: Animalia
- Phylum: Arthropoda
- Class: Insecta
- Order: Diptera
- Family: Agromyzidae
- Subfamily: Phytomyzinae
- Genus: Phytomyza
- Species: P. aquilegivora

Binomial name
- Phytomyza aquilegivora Spencer, 1969

= Phytomyza aquilegivora =

Species of fly

Phytomyza aquilegivora, the columbine leafminer, is a species of fly in the family Agromyzidae.

== Distribution ==
Canada, United States.
