= Hybridization in perennial plants =

Hybridization, when new offspring arise from crosses between individuals of the same or different species, results in the assemblage of diverse genetic material and can act as a stimulus for evolution. Hybrid species are often more vigorous than and often do not evenly blend the phenotypes of their parents. There are primarily two different forms of hybridization: natural hybridization in an uncontrolled environment, whereas artificial hybridization (or breeding) occurs primarily for agricultural purposes.

== Types ==
There are mainly two types of hybridization: interspecific and intraspecific. Interspecific hybridization is the mating process between two different species. Intraspecific hybridization is the mating process within the species, often between genetically distinct lineages. Hybridization sometimes results in introgression, which can occur in response to habitat disturbance that puts plant species into contact with each other. Introgression is gene transfer among taxa and is a result of hybridization, followed by repeated backcrossing with parental individuals. Introgressive hybridization occurs often in plants, and results in increased genetic variation, which can facilitate rapid response to climate change.

== Hybridization in perennial plant systems ==
Hybridization is considered to be an evolutionary catalyst capable of generating novel genotypes or phenotypes in a single generation. It can also happen with morphologically dissimilar but closely related species (Example: Helianthus giganteus, the giant sunflower).

In plants, hybridization mostly generates speciation events, and commonly produces polyploid species. Factors like polyploidy events also plays significant factors for understanding the hybridization events (Example: an F1 hybrid of Jatropha curcas x Ricinus communis), because these polyploids tend to have an advantage for the early stages of adaptation due to their expanded genomes. As a result, hybridization can be a powerful driver for improving agricultural crops, but can also facilitate unwanted species invasions (e.g., annual sunflower).

While hybridization in perennial plants can occur naturally, for example as the result of cross breeding with wild type relatives near agricultural fields, intentional hybridization in perennial crops has also been of recent interest in agriculture. While Hybridization and breeding methods have produced successful crop species, declining yield is a major challenge. Thus, further research is needed for leveraging hybridization in perennial crop systems to produce sustainable and high yielding crops. Some methods that are currently being explored include applying modern genotyping, phenotyping, and speed breeding techniques. When crosses in the laboratory are difficult, researchers can study hybrid zones that arise naturally in the field.

For efforts to leverage hybridization to improve perennial crops to be successful, there need to be continued efforts toward building a broad collection of crop wild relatives, genomic sequencing of related species, creating and phenotyping desired hybrid populations, and developing a network for genotype and phenotype associations and locate phenotype into crop breeding pipelines. Hybridization among perennials is also of interest because they may hybridize naturally or artificially with annual crops. For one of the most dietarily and economically significant examples, Dewey 1984 finds that a perennial Agropyron has hybridized with hexaploid wheat. Dewey finds an ancient hybridization event contributed significantly to the modern hexaploid multi-genome – and as with all other currently grown Triticeae crops, wheat is an annual.
