= List of Pristiphora species =

These 134 species belong to Pristiphora, a genus of common sawflies in the family Tenthredinidae.

== Pristiphora species ==
- Pristiphora abbreviata (Hartig)^{i c g}
- Pristiphora abietina (Christ, 1791)^{g}
- Pristiphora affinis (Lindqvist, 1952)^{g}
- Pristiphora albilabris (Boheman, 1852)^{g}
- Pristiphora albitibia (Costa, 1859)^{g}
- Pristiphora alpestris (Konow, 1903)^{g}
- Pristiphora anderschi (Zaddach, 1876)^{g}
- Pristiphora angulata Lindqvist, 1974^{g}
- Pristiphora aphantoneura (Foerster, 1854)^{g}
- Pristiphora appendiculata (Hartig, 1837)^{g b} (green currantworm)
- Pristiphora aquilegiae (Vollenhoven, 1866)^{g}
- Pristiphora armata (Thomson, 1862)^{g}
- Pristiphora astragali Vikberg, 1978^{g}
- Pristiphora atlantica Malaise, 1939^{g}
- Pristiphora atripes (Lindqvist, 1952)^{g}
- Pristiphora banksi ^{b}
- Pristiphora beaumonti Zirngiebl, 1957^{g}
- Pristiphora bensoni Lindqvist, 1953^{g}
- Pristiphora bifida (Hellén, 1948)^{g}
- Pristiphora biscalis (Foerster, 1854)^{g}
- Pristiphora bivittata (Norton, 1861)^{b}
- Pristiphora borea (Konow, 1904)^{g}
- Pristiphora borneensis Forsius^{g}
- Pristiphora breadalbanensis (Cameron, 1882)^{g}
- Pristiphora brevis (Hartig, 1837)^{g}
- Pristiphora brunniapex Lindqvist, 1960^{g}
- Pristiphora bufo (Brischke, 1883)^{g}
- Pristiphora cadma Wong & Ross, 1960^{g}
- Pristiphora camtschatcalis (Enslin, 1927)^{g}
- Pristiphora carinata (Hartig, 1837)^{g}
- Pristiphora carpathiensis Haris, 2001^{g}
- Pristiphora chalybeata Benson^{g}
- Pristiphora chlorea (Norton)^{b}
- Pristiphora cincta Newman, 1837^{g b}
- Pristiphora coactula (Ruthe, 1859)^{g}
- Pristiphora compressa (Hartig, 1837)^{g}
- Pristiphora concolor (Lindqvist, 1952)^{g}
- Pristiphora condei Lindqvist, 1955^{g}
- Pristiphora confusa Lindqvist, 1955^{g}
- Pristiphora congener (W.F.Kirby, 1882)^{g}
- Pristiphora coniceps Lindqvist, 1955^{g}
- Pristiphora conjugata (Dahlbom, 1835)^{g}
- Pristiphora crassicornis (Hartig, 1837)^{g}
- Pristiphora cretica W.Schedl, 1981^{g}
- Pristiphora dasiphorae Zinovjev, 1993^{g}
- Pristiphora decipiens (Enslin, 1916)^{g}
- Pristiphora denudata Konow, 1902^{g}
- Pristiphora depressa Hartig, 1840^{g}
- Pristiphora dissimilis Lindqvist, 1971^{g}
- Pristiphora dochmocera (Thomson, 1871)^{g}
- Pristiphora erichsonii (Hartig)^{i c g b} (larch sawfly)
- Pristiphora exigua (Lindqvist, 1956)^{g}
- Pristiphora fausta (Hartig, 1837)^{g}
- Pristiphora formosana Rohwer, 1916^{g}
- Pristiphora forsiusi Enslin, 1916^{g}
- Pristiphora friesei (Konow, 1904)^{g}
- Pristiphora frigida (Boheman, 1865)^{g}
- Pristiphora fulvipes (Fallén, 1808)^{g}
- Pristiphora gaunitzi Lindqvist, 1968^{g}
- Pristiphora geniculata (Hartig)^{i c g b} (mountain ash sawfly)
- Pristiphora gerula (Konow, 1904)^{g}
- Pristiphora glauca Benson, 1954^{g}
- Pristiphora groenblomi (Lindqvist, 1952)^{g}
- Pristiphora hoverlaensis Haris, 2001^{g}
- Pristiphora hyperborea Malaise, 1921^{g}
- Pristiphora idiota Norton, 1867^{g}
- Pristiphora insularis Rohwer, 1910^{g}
- Pristiphora kamtchatica Malaise, 1931^{g}
- Pristiphora karvoneni (Lindqvist, 1952)^{g}
- Pristiphora kontuniemii (Lindqvist, 1952)^{g}
- Pristiphora kuznetzovorum (Enslin, 1919)^{g}
- Pristiphora lanifica (Zaddach, 1883)^{g}
- Pristiphora laricis (Hartig, 1837)^{g}
- Pristiphora lativentris (Thomson, 1871)^{g}
- Pristiphora leucopodia (Hartig, 1837)^{g}
- Pristiphora leucopus Hellén, 1948^{g}
- Pristiphora listoni Lacourt, 1998^{g}
- Pristiphora luteipes Lindqvist, 1955^{g}
- Pristiphora maesta (Zaddach, 1876)^{g}
- Pristiphora malaisei (Lindqvist, 1952)^{g}
- Pristiphora melanocarpa (Hartig, 1840)^{g}
- Pristiphora micronematica Malaise, 1931^{g}
- Pristiphora mollis (Hartig, 1837)^{g b}
- Pristiphora monogyniae (Hartig, 1840)^{g}
- Pristiphora moravica Gregor, 1940^{g}
- Pristiphora murielae Lacourt, 1995^{g}
- Pristiphora nievesi Haris, 2004^{g}
- Pristiphora nigricans Eversmann, 1847^{g}
- Pristiphora nigriceps (Hartig, 1840)^{g}
- Pristiphora nordmani (Lindqvist, 1949)^{g}
- Pristiphora normani (Lindqvist, 1949)^{g}
- Pristiphora opaca Lindqvist, 1955^{g}
- Pristiphora paedida (Konow, 1904)^{g}
- Pristiphora pallida (Konow, 1904)^{g}
- Pristiphora pallidiventris (Fallén, 1808)^{g}
- Pristiphora pallipes Serville, 1823^{g}
- Pristiphora paralella Hartig, 1840^{g}
- Pristiphora parnasia Konow, 1902^{g}
- Pristiphora piceae (Zhelochovtsev, 1988)^{g}
- Pristiphora pseudocoactula (Lindqvist, 1952)^{g}
- Pristiphora pseudodecipiens Beneš & Krístek, 1976^{g}
- Pristiphora pseudogeniculata Lindqvist, 1969^{g}
- Pristiphora punctifrons (Thomson, 1871)^{g}
- Pristiphora pusilla Malaise, 1921^{g}
- Pristiphora pygmaea Lindqvist, 1964^{g}
- Pristiphora quercus (Hartig, 1837)^{g}
- Pristiphora retusa (Thomson, 1871)^{g}
- Pristiphora reuteri (Lindqvist, 1960)^{g}
- Pristiphora robusta (Konow, 1895)^{g}
- Pristiphora ruficornis (Olivier, 1811)^{g}
- Pristiphora rufipes Lepeletier, 1823^{g b} (columbine sawfly)
- Pristiphora saliciphilus (Liston, 2007)^{g}
- Pristiphora sareptana Kuznetzov-Ugamskij, 1924^{g}
- Pristiphora sauteri Rohwer, 1916^{g}
- Pristiphora saxesenii (Hartig, 1837)^{g}
- Pristiphora schedli Liston & Späth, 2008^{g}
- Pristiphora sermola Liston, 1993^{g}
- Pristiphora sinensis Wong^{g}
- Pristiphora sootryeni Lindqvist, 1955^{g}
- Pristiphora staudingeri (Ruthe, 1859)^{g}
- Pristiphora subarctica (Forsslund, 1936)^{g}
- Pristiphora subbifida (Thomson, 1871)^{g}
- Pristiphora subopaca Lindqvist, 1955^{g}
- Pristiphora tenuicornis (Lindqvist, 1955)^{g}
- Pristiphora tenuiserra (Lindqvist, 1958)^{g}
- Pristiphora testacea (Jurine, 1807)^{g}
- Pristiphora tetrica (Zaddach, 1883)^{g}
- Pristiphora thalictri (Kriechbaumer, 1884)^{g}
- Pristiphora thalictrivora Lindqvist, 1962^{g}
- Pristiphora thomsoni Lindqvist, 1953^{g}
- Pristiphora trochanterica (Lindqvist, 1952)^{g}
- Pristiphora vicina (Lepeletier, 1823)^{g}
- Pristiphora viridana Konow, 1902^{g}
- Pristiphora wesmaeli (Tischbein, 1853)^{g}

Data sources: i = ITIS, c = Catalogue of Life, g = GBIF, b = Bugguide.net
