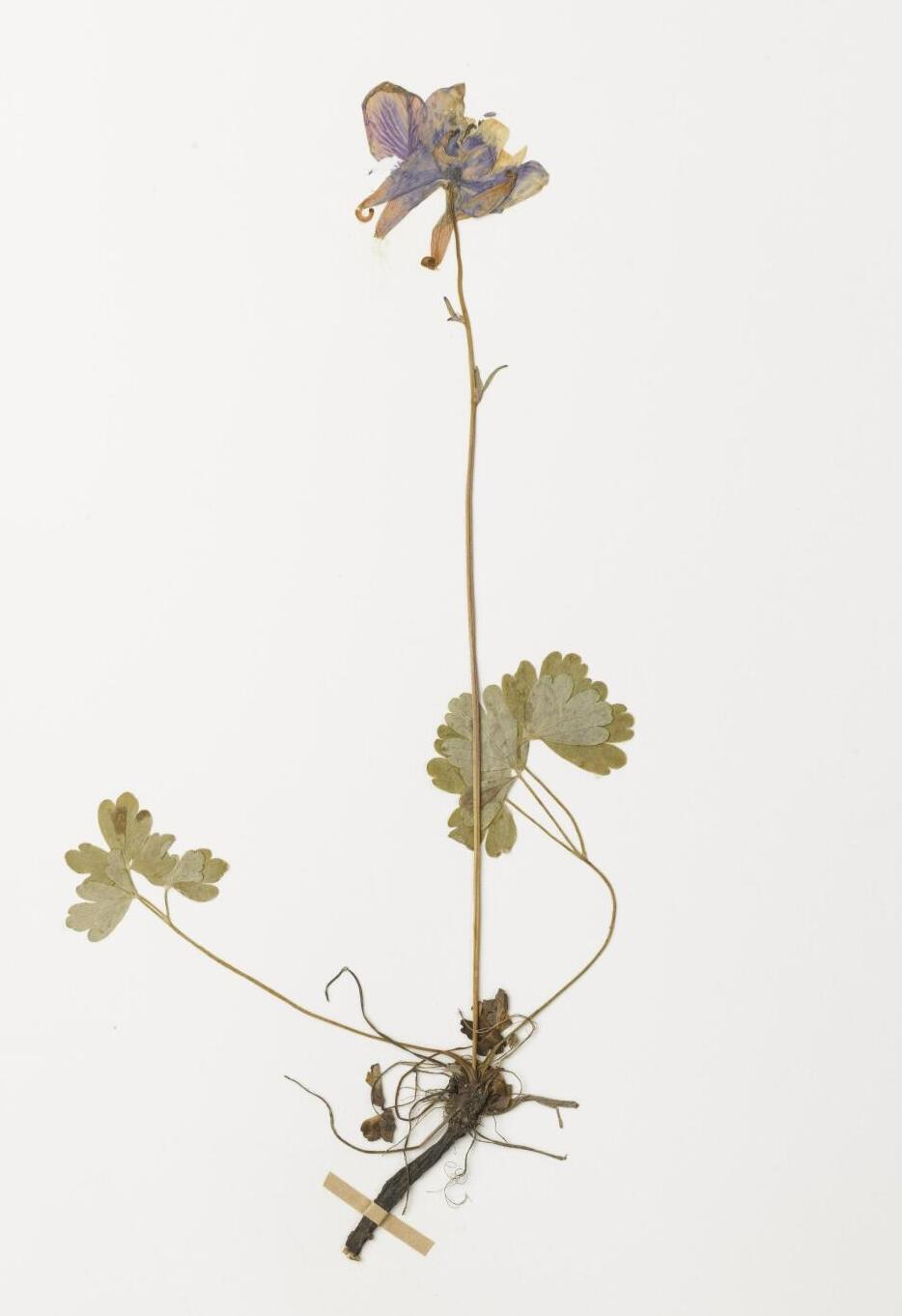
- Preserved specimen of Aquilegia amurensis

Scientific classification
- Kingdom: Plantae
- Clade: Tracheophytes
- Clade: Angiosperms
- Clade: Eudicots
- Order: Ranunculales
- Family: Ranunculaceae
- Genus: Aquilegia
- Species: A. amurensis

Binomial name
- Aquilegia amurensis Not. Syst. Herb. Hort. Bot.

Synonyms
- Aquilegia flabellata Siebold & Zucc. Aquilegia flabellata var. alpina Izv. Imp. Akad. Nauk Kuzen.

= Aquilegia amurensis =

Species of flowering plant

Aquilegia amurensis is a partially accepted species of flowering plant in the genus Aquilegia (columbines) in the family Ranunculaceae that is native to northeast Asia. Its natural range is in the northern Greater Khingan mountain range and Amur River of China, as well as Siberian Russia, Mongolia, and possibly North Korea. Flowers of this plant have petal blades that are whitish or white-tipped, with blue-violet nectar spurs and sepals. The plant is rarely cultivated.

== Description ==
Aquilegia amurensis grows to be about 50 centimetres (20 in) tall. It possesses leaves in a basal arrangement (sprouting from base of the shoot), seldom if ever with leaves on the stem. The leaflets are glabrous (smooth) on their topsides with soft, downy bottoms. The leaflets are trisected to their base. The petioles are extremely slender and subglabrous, extending between 6 centimetres (2.4 in) and 15 centimetres (5.9 in) in length.

The plant's flowers are suberect with blue-violet nectar spurs and sepals. The spurs are particularly hooked and have lengths of between 10 millimetres (0.39 in) and 15 millimetres (0.59 in) long. A. amurensis's sepals are elliptical with lengths of between 15 millimetres (0.59 in) and 25 millimetres (0.98 in) long that curve to an acute point. The petal blades are oblong, spreading roughly along the floral axis. The blades range between 7 millimetres (0.28 in) and 12 millimetres (0.47 in) long and are whitish or white-tipped. The stamen are exserted (extending beyond the length of the pedals) and capped with yellow anthers that are 1 millimetre (0.039 in) long.

A variety, A. amurensis var. albiflora, possesses white flowers. When compared to Aquilegia sibirica, A. amurensis emulates its leafless stems and hooked spurs but deviates with more acute sepals, pilose leaflets and pedicels, less nodding flowers, and follicles that are not glabrous.

== Taxonomy ==
Aquilegia amurensis received its binomial in 1926 within Botanicheskie Materialy Gerbariia Glavnogo Botanicheskogo Sada S.S.S.R. in the Soviet Union. The plant was first identified under the name Aquilegia flabellata var. alpina within Izvestiya Imperatorskoi Akademii Nauk in 1915. A. amurensis is one of approximately 110 species in the genus Aquilegia.

According to a 2024 phylogenetic study by Chinese researchers Huaying Wang and Wei Zhang, A. amurensis diverged from the now geographically disjunct Aquilegia japonica (Note: Commonly known as Aquilegia flabellata.) approximately 22,970 years ago, corresponding with the Last Glacial Maximum. However, this data might be marred with interbreeding spurred by refugia populations lacking conspecific mates or other events. Wang and Zhang found that chloroplast DNA suggests A. amurensis is genetically more closely related to Aquilegia parviflora – with which it shares a clade – and the North American columbine clade than with A. japonica. However, a 2013 study constructed a phylogenetic tree that suggested that the inverse was true; Wang and Zhang theorized that this was the result of the 2013 study utilizing a different variant of A. japonica.

Despite similarities in the shape of the shoots and leaves to Aquilegia barykinae, another species in the same region, it is not likely to be a close relative. Instead, A. barykinae was described upon its first description as possessing a closer affinity to Aquilegia vulgaris.

== Distribution ==
The plant is native to the northern Greater Khingan mountain range and Amur River of China, as well as Siberian Russia, Mongolia, and possibly North Korea. A 2017 paper in Phytotaxa claimed to be the first to record A. amurensis as present in China. Wang and Zhang mapped the range of A. amurensis extending through northern China and eastern Siberian Russia.

Botanist Philip A. Munz described the type locality of the species as "R. Lagar, near Radde, Amur, Siberia". Roy Lancaster included an image of A. amurensis in his Travels in China: A Plantman's Paradise. The plant pictured was found the Changbai Mountains on the Chinese side of the nation's border with North Korea. The range of A. amurensis possibly extends over this border. (Note: Nold noted that the image in Lancaster's book did not precisely correspond with the description provided by Munz and given by Flora of the U.S.S.R.) Munz noted that the Soviet botanist Vladimir Leontyevich Komarov had reported A. amurensis in northern Korea from the Yalu River.

== Cultivation ==
In his 1946 Aquilegia: The Cultivated and Wild Columbines, Munz said that he was aware of seeds being offered for sale by a Japanese company. He added that he was not aware of any other cultivation of the species. As of 2003, American botanist Robert Nold reported that the plant was "rarely, if ever, encountered in cultivation".
