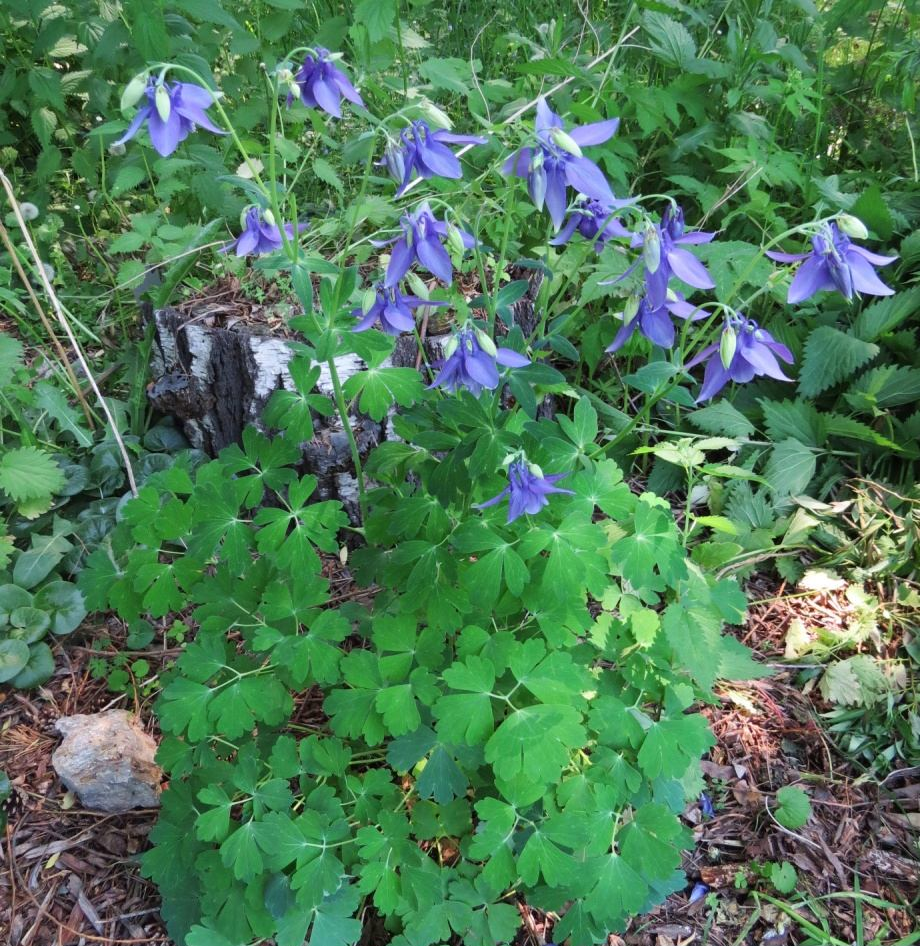
- Aquilegia barykinae in flower

Scientific classification
- Kingdom: Plantae
- Clade: Tracheophytes
- Clade: Angiosperms
- Clade: Eudicots
- Order: Ranunculales
- Family: Ranunculaceae
- Genus: Aquilegia
- Species: A. barykinae

Binomial name
- Aquilegia barykinae Erst, Karakulov & Luferov

= Aquilegia barykinae =

Species of flowering plant

Aquilegia barykinae is a perennial flowering plant in the family Ranunculaceae, endemic to the Russian Far East. The species was first described in 2014. Its flowers are lilac-blue.

== Description ==
Aquilegia barykinae is a perennial herb growing to 25–70 cm (10–28 in) tall. The stems are erect and have glandular hairs, and are branched at the top. The basal leaves are biternate or triternate (i.e. with three stalks, each with three leaflets that divide into three lobes) and measure 6–30 cm (2–12 in) in length, with stalks of 3–20 cm (1–8 in) length which may be smooth or hairy. The flowers are 3–5 cm (1.2–2.0 in) long by 5–8 cm (2.0–3.1 in) across, covered with short hairs. Both the petals and the sepals are blue or lilac-blue. The sepals are egg-shaped, somewhat pointed towards the tip, and 2.5–3.5 cm (1.0–1.4 in) long. The petals have a markedly curved nectar spur of 1.5–3 cm (0.6–1.2 in) length. The stamens are light cream in colour and the same length as or slightly longer than the petals.

== Taxonomy ==
Aquilegia barykinae is likely closely related to the widespread species Aquilegia vulgaris, and to the Asian species Aquilegia oxysepala and Aquilegia buergeriana. Despite similarities in the shape of the shoots and leaves to Aquilegia amurensis, another species in the same region, it is not likely to be a close relative.

The type specimen was collected by Anatoliy Karakulov on 23 June 2010, and the species was formally described by Andrey Erst, Karakulov, and Aleksandr Luferov in 2014.

=== Etymology ===
The specific epithet barykinae honours the Russian botanist Rimma Pavlovna Barykina (1928–2021) of Moscow State University, a specialist in the morphology and anatomy of plants in the family Ranunculaceae.

== Distribution and habitat ==
Aquilegia barykinae is endemic to the Tukuringra Ridge in Amur Oblast in the Russian Far East. It grows mainly on stony and gravelly scree and among rocks and shrubs in mountainous forested areas.

== Conservation ==
As of December 2024, the species has not been assessed for the IUCN Red List.
