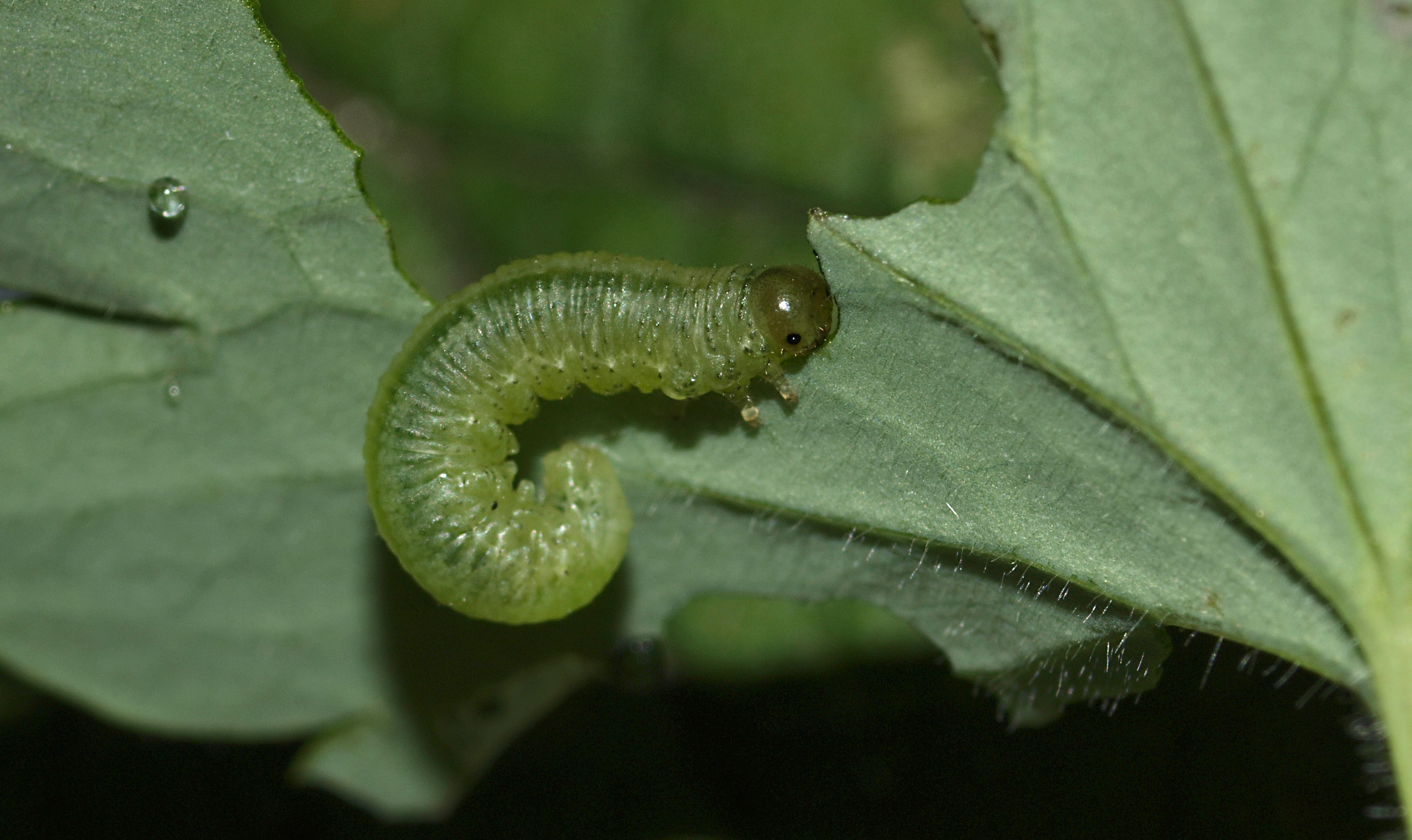
- A Pristiphora rufipes larva in Denmark

Scientific classification
- Kingdom: Animalia
- Phylum: Arthropoda
- Clade: Pancrustacea
- Class: Insecta
- Order: Hymenoptera
- Suborder: Symphyta
- Family: Tenthredinidae
- Genus: Pristiphora
- Species: P. rufipes

Binomial name
- Pristiphora rufipes Serville 1823

Synonyms
- List: Pristiphora fusca Serville; Nematus suessionensis Serville; Pristiphora alnivora Torka 1934; Pristiphora alnivora Lorenz & Kraus 1957; Nematus selandrioides Costa; Nematus aquilegiae Snellen van Vollenhoven

= Columbine sawfly =

Species of sawfly

Pristiphora rufipes, commonly known as the columbine sawfly, is a species of sawfly in the genus Pristiphora. The species consumes wild and cultivated Aquilegia (columbine) plants. Native to Europe, it has been observed in North America since at least 1963 and is considered an invasive pest on that continent. Columbine sawflies lay eggs on the edges of columbine leaves. The larvae eat the leaves before constructing cocoons that drop into leaf litter. Once mature, they reach between 4.5 mm (0.18 in) and 5.5 mm (0.22 in) long.

== Physical appearance ==
=== Larvae ===
As larvae, columbine sawflies are small and green, resembling the caterpillars of the columbine duskywing but without the caterpillars' solid black heads. At their final stage of development (last instar), the larvae reach approximately 12–13 mm (0.47–0.51 in) long. At this stage, a larva possesses a yellow-green head and a green trunk with a dark but translucent blood vessel flanked by fat in white strips. An individual possesses a mandible with a single seta, while the head has multiple erect setae. Distinct from Pristiphora sareptana, P. rufipes lacks black basal rings found at the base of the setae of its thorax and lateral lobes. The larval stage lasts several weeks. Each larva constructs a brown cocoon that is oblong in shape and drops into the leaf litter.

=== Imago ===
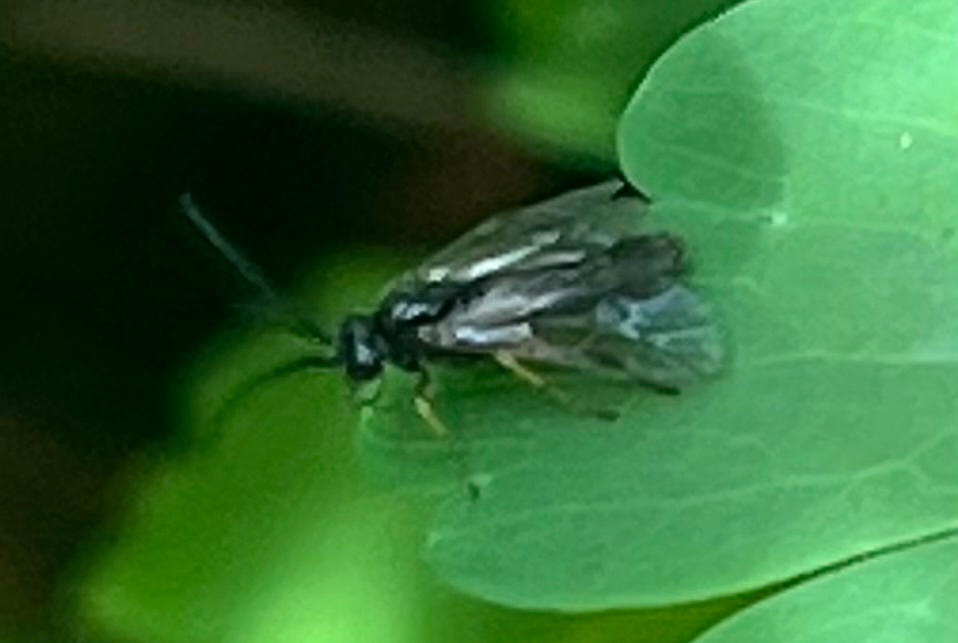
An adult columbine sawfly on an Aquilegia leaf in Wisconsin

As fully developed imagoes, the only morphologically diagnostic features distinguishing members of the rufipes species group from members of the ruficornis group are their lancets and penis valves. Among the distinguishing features of the penis valves within the rufipes group is the presence of rectangular and unmodified pseudoceps. A small subapical tooth is present on each member of the rufipes group. The lancet of the columbine sawfly is slightly different from other species within its group, with the most prominent portions of their serrulae (serrations) being acute as opposed to the blunter serrulae on other species in the rufipes group.

A mature P. rufipes grows to between 4.5 mm (0.18 in) and 5.5 mm (0.22 in) long. The sawsheath of each female possesses a distinct scopa at its tip. In the species's range within England, Wales, and Scotland, the flight period is between May and September. Eggs are laid on the leaf edges.

Members of the rufipes group typically possess abdomens that are entirely black. However, specimens from Ukraine, Armenia, and North Caucasus identified as within the group but not assigned to any individual species have abdomens that range from black to entirely yellow.

== Ecology ==
The host plants of the columbine sawfly are primarily members of the genus Aquilegia (columbines) in both the wild and in gardens, including A. canadensis, A. coerulea, A. chrysantha, A. flabellata, A. olympica, and A. vulgaris. Larvae consume leaves from the outer edges inward and can defoliate leaves such that only their primary veins remain. The columbine sawfly generally prefers mesophilous vegetation in a variety of settings within forests, parks, and gardens. In North America, columbine sawflies larvae begin consuming columbine leaves by May and complete their single seasonal generation in June. As a larva grows in physical size, its capacity to damage leaves increases.

== Taxonomy ==
Pristiphora rufipes was first described in 1823 within the French entomologist Jean Guillaume Audinet-Serville's chapter on Hymenoptera for the multivolume Faune Française, ou histoire naturelle, générale et particuliére, des animaux qui se trouvent en France. The larvae of the species were redescribed in 2016 by the Czech entomologist Jan Macek in the journal Acta Entomologica Musei Nationalis Pragae.

Grouping Pristiphora species by external features is complicated by the absence of definitive physical characteristics that unites the entire genus as well as the few defining features universally present within individual species groups. P. rufipes is treated as head of the rufipes species group (also called the thalictri and aquilegiae group). The boundaries between species of this group are unclear, though it comprises at least two species: the Aquilegia-eating P. rufipes and one or more other species consuming plants in the genus Thalictrum. This group is closely related to the ruficornis group headed by P. ruficornis.

Determining the phylogeny of Pristiphora through genetics has been complicated due to many species not being identifiable utilizing DNA barcoding with the cytochrome c oxidase subunit I (COI) gene. DNA barcoding from specimens collected off Aquilegia plants show that their barcode index numbers cluster closely with those associated with P. brevis and P. thalictri in the Barcode of Life Data System.

== Distribution ==
As with other Pristophora in the rufipes group, the P. rufipes is native to the northwestern portion of the Palearctic realm. Its native range spans Europe, including the British Isles, Iberian Peninsula, Italy, Scandinavia, Baltic states, European Russia, and North Macedonia. A 2024 review of British sawflies for Natural England assessed the species as having a conservation status of least concern in Great Britain against the IUCN Red List criteria.

The columbine sawfly has become an invasive species in North America. Its first recorded observance in Canada was in Ottawa in 1963. It subsequently spread to the United States, with its presence in New York reported in 1985. Further reports indicated the columbine sawfly as present in Pennsylvania, West Virginia, Minnesota, and Illinois. Observances recorded in 2012 in Fairfax County and Prince William County were the first records of the species in Virginia and, at the time, the southern-most observations of the species.

== As pests ==
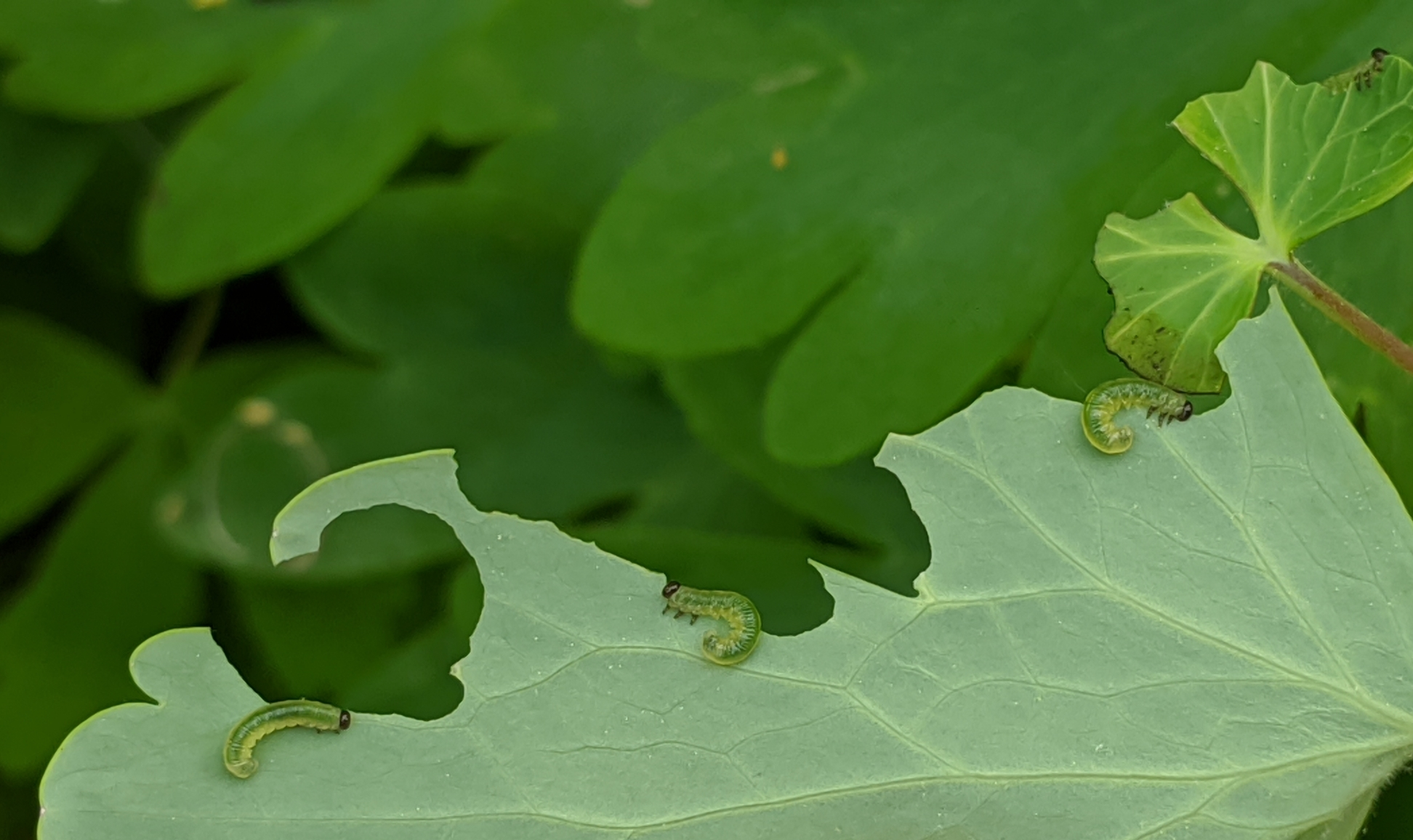
Columbine sawfly larvae are considered garden pests and are not pollinators.

Due to their consumption of cultivated columbines, the columbine sawfly is considered a garden pest. Unlike other insects that interact with columbines, the columbine sawfly is not a pollinator. If there are a small number of columbine sawflies, they can be removed by hand and killed by disposing of larvae into soapy water. Direct application of insecticidal soap or spinosad are effective low-impact treatments for larger populations of columbine sawflies. Residual insecticides, such as permethrin and pyrethroids like esfenvalerate and bifenthrin, are also effective treatments against the species.
