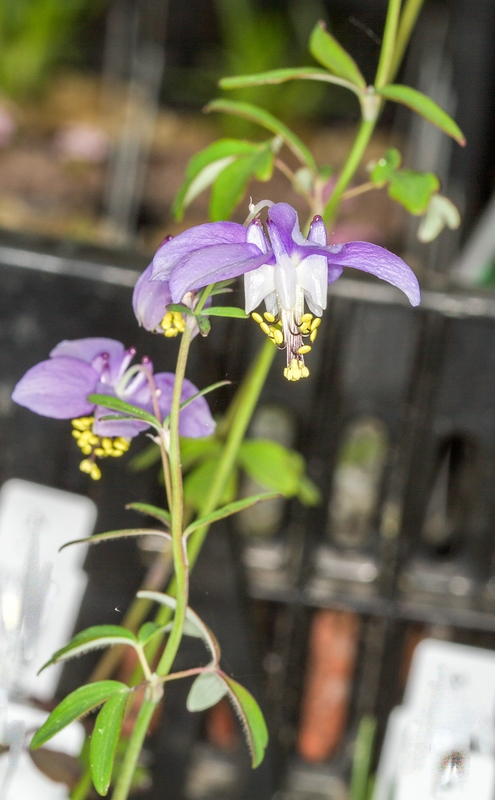
- Aquilegia parviflora flowers

Scientific classification
- Kingdom: Plantae
- Clade: Tracheophytes
- Clade: Angiosperms
- Clade: Eudicots
- Order: Ranunculales
- Family: Ranunculaceae
- Genus: Aquilegia
- Species: A. parviflora

Binomial name
- Aquilegia parviflora Ledebour

Synonyms
- Aquilegia thalictroides Schltdl. 1831

= Aquilegia parviflora =

Species of flowering plant

Aquilegia parviflora is a species of flowering plant of the Aquilegia (columbine) genus in the family Ranunculaceae native to the Asian regions of Siberia, northern Mongolia, northern China, and Sakhalin.

Its comparatively small blue-purple flowers give the plant its name and make it less popular with gardeners than other columbines. The plant is well-suited to rock gardens.

== Description ==
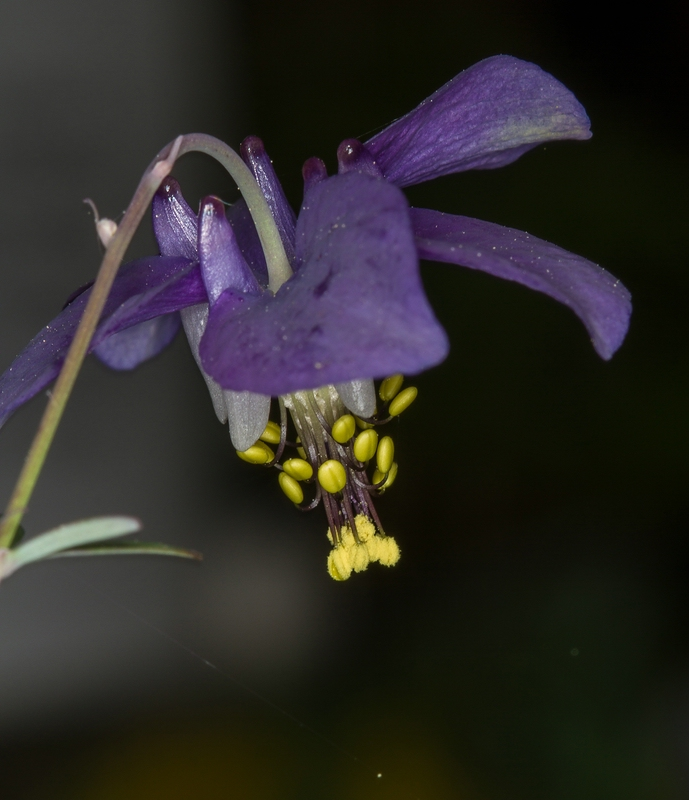
A. parviflora is a particularly small-flowered species of columbine.

Aquilegia parviflora grows to roughly 40 centimetres (16 in) tall – with an observed range between 10 centimetres (3.9 in) and 80 centimetres (31 in) – with stems of between 1 millimetre (0.039 in) and 2 millimetres (0.079 in) thick. Plants can possess numerous stems, each of which are branched. The plant's stems are glabrous. The plant's few leaves are in a basal arrangement (growing from the base of the stems) and are leathery.

Flowering lasts between two and three weeks during the mid-spring (June). The plants have numerous but small flowers which each measure between 2.5 centimetres (0.98 in) and 3.5 centimetres (1.4 in) across. The sepals are blue-purple and range between 15 millimetres (0.59 in) and 20 millimetres (0.79 in) long. The sepals spread and are ovate or oblong-ovate in shape. The petal blades can be blue-purple or white and are between 3 millimetres (0.12 in) and 5 millimetres (0.20 in) long. Stamens are between 8 millimetres (0.31 in) and 11 millimetres (0.43 in) long. Nectar spurs are short compared to other Aquilegia and heavily curved, extending only between 3 millimetres (0.12 in) and 5 millimetres (0.20 in) in length. Spurless instances of A. parviflora have been observed.

Fruiting occurs a month following flowering. Seeds are 2 millimetres (0.079 in) long.

== Taxonomy ==
Aquilegia parviflora received its binomial in 1815 within Carl Friedrich von Ledebour's volume 5 of the Mémoires de l'Académie Imperiale des Sciences de St. Pétersbourg. Avec l'Histoire de l'Académie. The type locality is along the river Lena in Siberia. The species received the heterotypic synonym of Aquilegia thalictroides from Diederich Franz Leonhard von Schlechtendal in 1831. Philip A. Munz noted that some of the plant's physical characteristics – including its small flowers and short spurs – alongside its north-eastern Siberian range were sufficient to characterize A. parviflora as a distinct species.

A 2013 study of Aquilegia genetics indicated that a North American Aquilegia species shared their last common ancestor with species from the Far East – including A. parviflora – between 3.84 and 2.99 million years ago. This analysis corresponded with the theory that Aquilegia reached North America via a land bridge over the Bering Strait.

According to a 2024 phylogenetic study by Chinese researchers Huaying Wang and Wei Zhang, chloroplast DNA suggests Aquilegia amurensis is genetically more closely related to A. parviflora – with which it shares a clade – and the North American columbine clade than with Aquilegia japonica (Note: Commonly known as Aquilegia flabellata.) that more closely resembles A. amurensis. However, a 2013 study constructed a phylogenetic tree that suggested that the inverse was true; Wang and Zhang theorized that this was the result of the 2013 study utilizing a different variant of A. japonica.

=== Etymology ===
The word columbine derives from the Latin word columbinus, meaning "dove", a reference to the flowers' appearance of a group of doves. The genus name Aquilegia may come from the Latin word for "eagle", aquila, in reference to the petals' resemblance to eagle talons. Aquilegia may also derive from aquam legere, which is Latin for "to collect water", or aquilegium, a Latin word for a container of water. The name parviflora means "small-flowered".

== Distribution ==
The species is native to the Asian regions of Siberia, northern Mongolia, and northern China. In Russia, its presence has been documented in Amur Oblast, the former Chita Oblast (now part of Zabaykalsky Krai), Irkutsk Oblast, Khabarovsk Krai, Krasnoyarsk Krai, Magadan Oblast, Primorsky Krai, Sakha Republic, and the island of Sakhalin. In China, it is found in Inner Mongolia and Manchuria. It favors the woodlands and slopes of its range. The plant favors forest clearings and meadows. The plant is found in this range at elevations of between 2,500 metres (8,200 ft) and 3,500 metres (11,500 ft).

In 1901, botanist and later Prime Minister of Finland A. K. Cajander traveled to along the lower portion of the Lena River in Siberia. Among the vascular plant species he gathered examples of was A. pavriflora, retaining four specimens. His notes indicate the plant's presence from the mouth of the Vilyuy (a tributary of the Lena) into subalpine zones, with occurrence of the species being "[f]airly frequent to very frequent". He recorded that its frequency decreased north of the Vilyuy's mouth until it ceased "halfway between the Vilyuy and Agrafena". He located examples in larch forests and on the margins of forests, saying the plant preferred "half-open places". Cajander said A. parviflora was "one of the most characteristic plants of the taiga by the Middle Lena" but that it was never present in alluvial plains.

In 2001, the Flora of China reported the species as present in Japan.

== Cultivation ==
Gardeners, who often favor columbine plants with larger flowers, tend to avoid acquiring the species. Cultivation of A. parviflora is generally reserved to collectors. In 1946, botanist Philip A. Munz noted that the flower did not appear to be cultivated in the United States.

Cultivation requires planting in sunny or semi-shaded positions. Russian botanist Tatyana Shulkina noted that the plant was well-suited for rock gardens.
