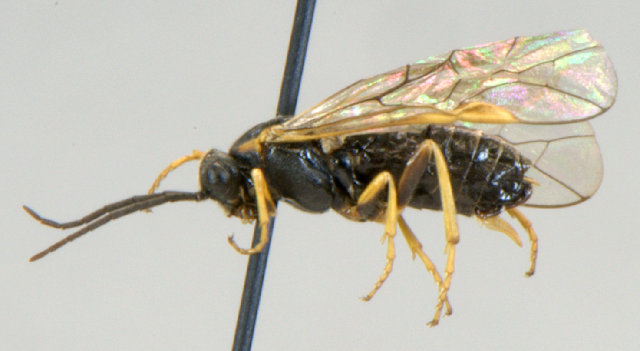
- Pristiphora mollis Alaska

Scientific classification
- Kingdom: Animalia
- Phylum: Arthropoda
- Clade: Pancrustacea
- Class: Insecta
- Order: Hymenoptera
- Suborder: Symphyta
- Family: Tenthredinidae
- Genus: Pristiphora
- Species: P. mollis

Binomial name
- Pristiphora mollis (Hartig, 1837)

= Pristiphora mollis =

Species of sawfly

Pristiphora mollis is a Holarctic species of sawfly. It is typically found in the United Kingdom.
