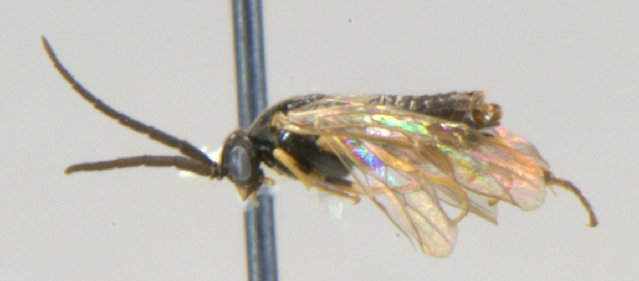
- Pristiphora cincta Alaska

Scientific classification
- Kingdom: Animalia
- Phylum: Arthropoda
- Clade: Pancrustacea
- Class: Insecta
- Order: Hymenoptera
- Suborder: Symphyta
- Family: Tenthredinidae
- Genus: Pristiphora
- Species: P. cincta

Binomial name
- Pristiphora cincta Newman, 1837

= Pristiphora cincta =

Species of sawfly

Pristiphora cincta is a Holarctic species of sawfly.
