= Aquilegia ballii =

Scientific classification
- Kingdom: Plantae
- Clade: Tracheophytes
- Clade: Angiosperms
- Clade: Eudicots
- Order: Ranunculales
- Family: Ranunculaceae
- Genus: Aquilegia
- Species: A. ballii

Binomial name
- Aquilegia ballii (Litard. & Maire) E.Nardi

Synonyms
- Aquilegia vulgaris subsp. ballii (Litard. & Maire) Dobignard & D.Jord.; Aquilegia vulgaris var. ballii Litard. & Maire

Species of flowering plant

Aquilegia ballii is a perennial species of flowering plant in the family Ranunculaceae that is endemic to Morocco.

== Description ==
Aquilegia ballii is a perennial herb growing to 70 to 80 cm (28 to 31 in) high. The rhizome is thick and covered with the remains of previous years' foliage. The stem is robust, smooth, and branched towards the top; the branches may be pubescent or glandular. The basal leaves are green on their upper surface and pale green on the underside, biternate or triternate (i.e. with three stalks, each with three leaflets that divide into three lobes), and have pubescent leaf stalks up to 22 cm (8.7 in) long. The flowers have white or slightly bluish sepals 2.5 cm (1 in) long and white petals 10 cm (3.9 in) long with blue, slightly curved nectar spurs of 13 to 14 mm (0.5 to 0.6 in) length. Both the sepals and petals are green at the tip and sparsely hairy. The anthers are bright yellow.

== Taxonomy ==
Aquilegia ballii was first described by René Verriet de Litardière and René Maire as the variety ballii of Aquilegia vulgaris in 1930. It was reassessed as a subspecies ballii of A. vulgaris by Alain Dobignard and Denis Jordan in 1987, and finally as a separate species in 2012 by Enio Nardi.

=== Etymology ===
The specific epithet ballii honours the Irish naturalist John Ball (1818–1889), who collected one of the first known specimens of the plant in the vicinity of the mountain Jbel Gourza.

== Distribution and habitat ==
Aquilegia ballii is endemic to the High Atlas mountains of Morocco, where it grows in damp meadows, by streams, and in damp rocky places at altitudes of 1,980 to 3,000 m (6,500 to 9,840 ft).

== Conservation ==
As of November 2024, the species has not been assessed for the IUCN Red List.
