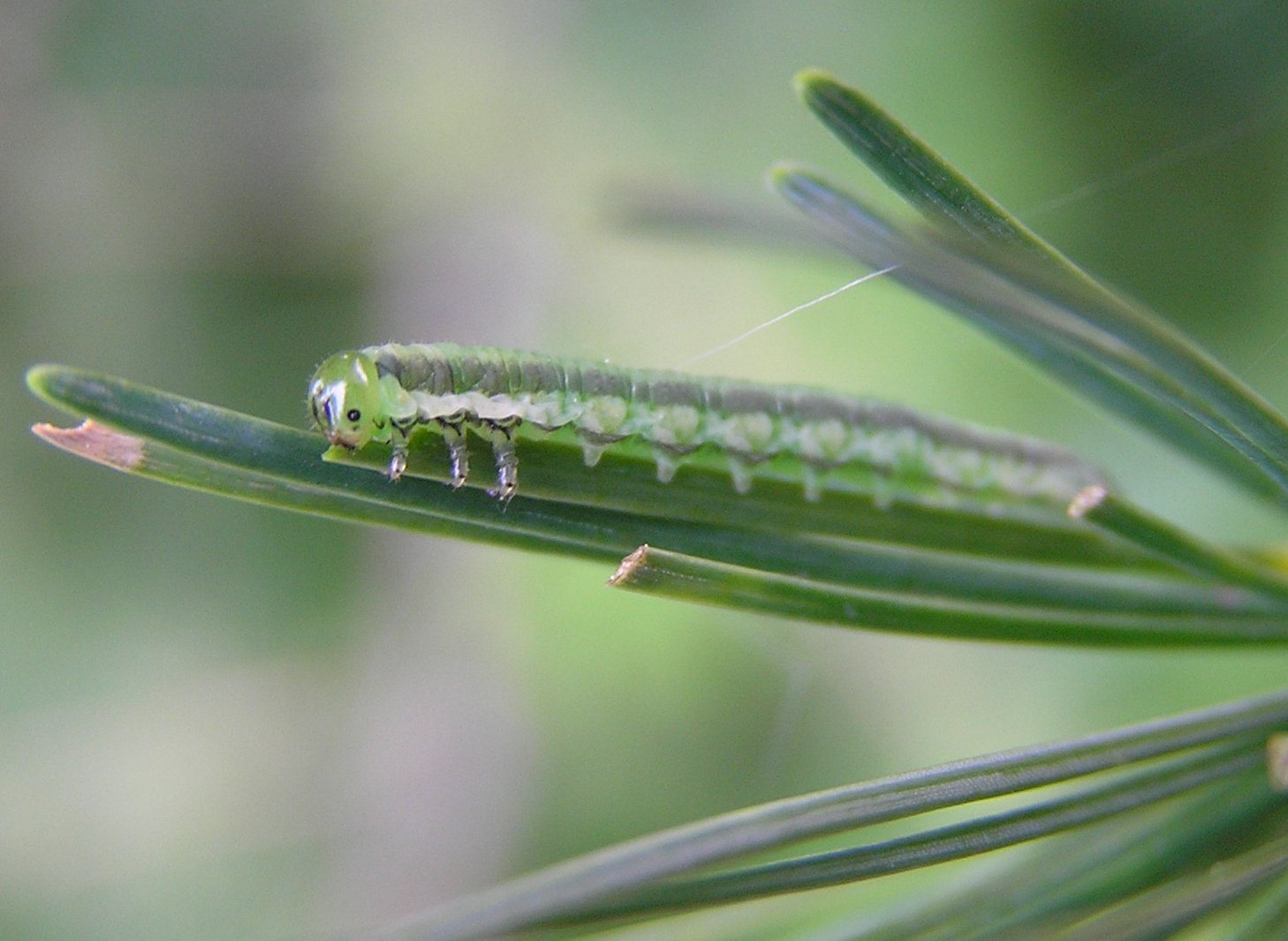
- Pristiphora laricis larva Poland

Scientific classification
- Kingdom: Animalia
- Phylum: Arthropoda
- Clade: Pancrustacea
- Class: Insecta
- Order: Hymenoptera
- Suborder: Symphyta
- Family: Tenthredinidae
- Genus: Pristiphora
- Species: P. laricis

Binomial name
- Pristiphora laricis (Hartig, 1837)

= Pristiphora laricis =

Species of sawfly

Pristiphora laricis is a Palearctic species of sawfly.
