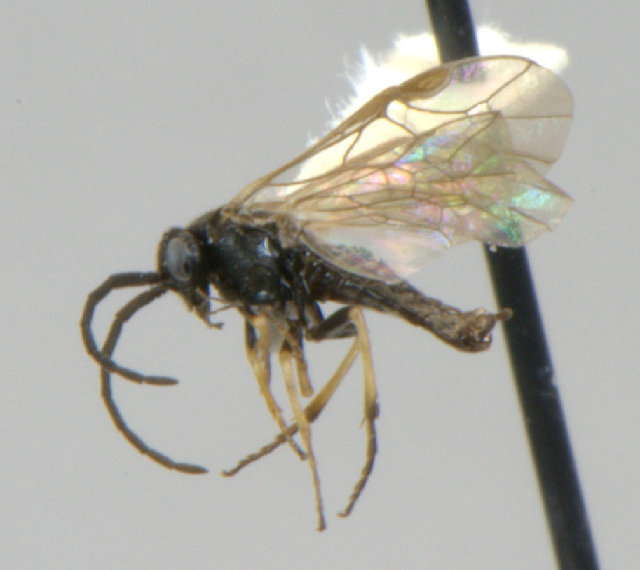
- Pristiphora staudingeri Alaska

Scientific classification
- Kingdom: Animalia
- Phylum: Arthropoda
- Clade: Pancrustacea
- Class: Insecta
- Order: Hymenoptera
- Suborder: Symphyta
- Family: Tenthredinidae
- Genus: Pristiphora
- Species: P. staudingeri

Binomial name
- Pristiphora staudingeri (Ruthe,1859)

= Pristiphora staudingeri =

Species of sawfly

Pristiphora staudingeri is a Holarctic species of sawfly.
