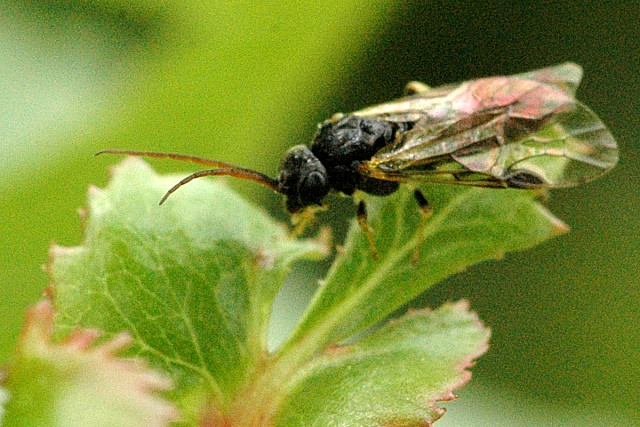

Scientific classification
- Kingdom: Animalia
- Phylum: Arthropoda
- Clade: Pancrustacea
- Class: Insecta
- Order: Hymenoptera
- Suborder: Symphyta
- Family: Tenthredinidae
- Genus: Pristiphora
- Species: P. geniculata

Binomial name
- Pristiphora geniculata (Hartig)

= Pristiphora geniculata =

Species of sawfly

Pristiphora geniculata, the mountain ash sawfly, is a species of common sawfly in the family Tenthredinidae. It is found in Europe.
