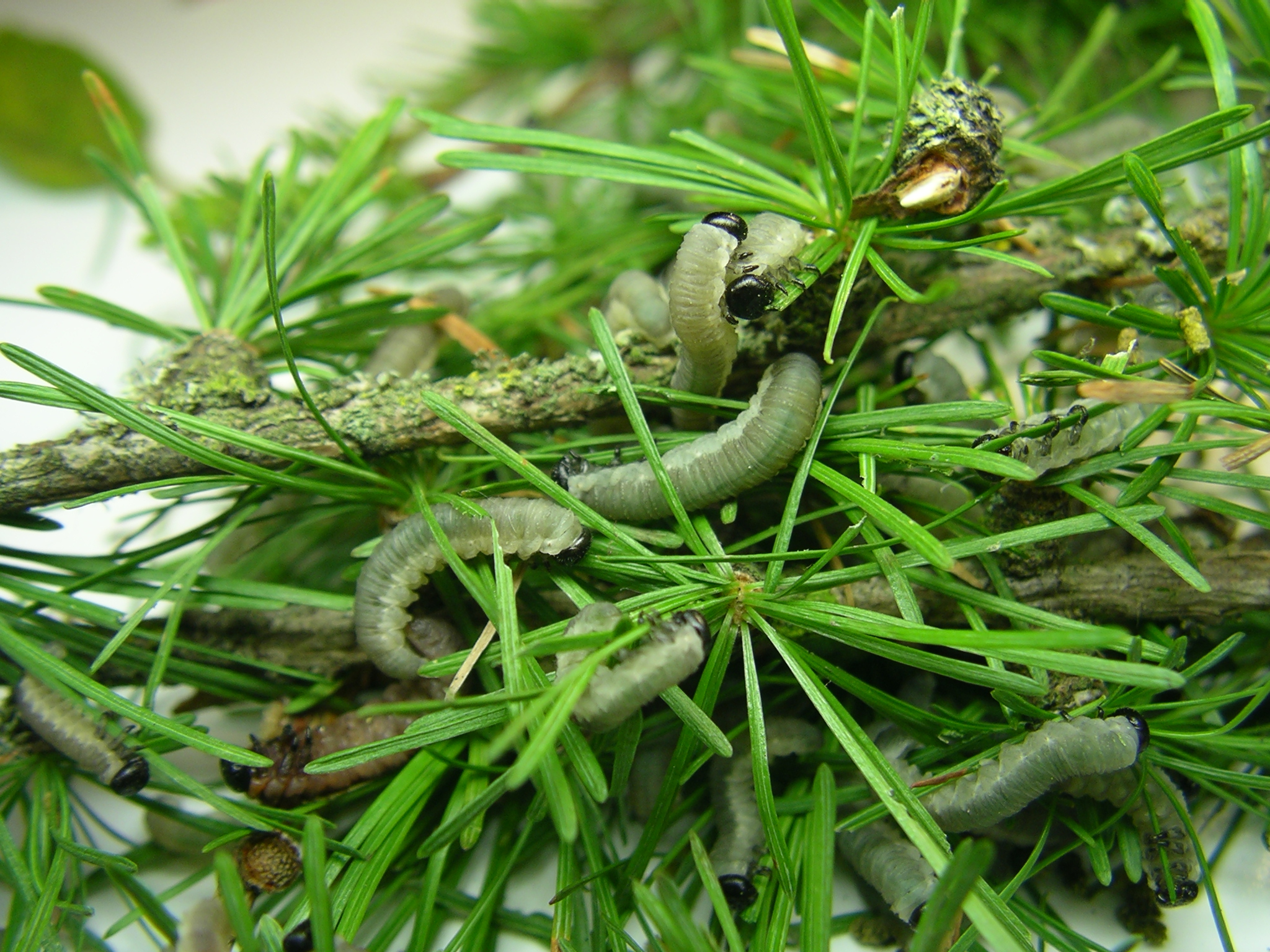

Scientific classification
- Kingdom: Animalia
- Phylum: Arthropoda
- Clade: Pancrustacea
- Class: Insecta
- Order: Hymenoptera
- Suborder: Symphyta
- Family: Tenthredinidae
- Genus: Pristiphora
- Species: P. erichsonii

Binomial name
- Pristiphora erichsonii (Hartig, 1837)

= Pristiphora erichsonii =

Species of sawfly

Pristiphora erichsonii, the larch sawfly, is a species of sawfly. The adult sawfly resembles a black wasp, is about ½ inch in length with a thick waist and has brown to orangish markings on the abdomen. Larvae have black heads, gray-green bodies with white undersides, and are about 15–18 mm long when full grown. Larvae occur in groups and characteristically curl their bodies upward in a "J" shape when disturbed.

In the spring when larch trees are leafed out and the new growth is expanding, the female sawfly can be seen depositing eggs in new shoots near the branch tips.

== Damage symptoms ==
Egg-laying causes shoots to curl as they grow. Larvae occur in groups or clumps and are very obvious when present. Defoliation is rarely complete but trees can appear very thin crowned.

Most trees are very tolerant of defoliation and trees generally recover during the summer, however severe defoliation over several years can weaken the trees causing them to be less likely to survive a harsh winter.

== Life cycle ==
Winter is spent in the soil as a prepupa. Adults emerge in late spring and females lay eggs in elongating shoots. Larvae feed on needles for 3–4 weeks, generally in late June and early July. However, emergence can be delayed for some individuals larva can be present throughout the summer.

== Origins ==
The larch sawfly is native to Europe, however introduced into North America in the mid to late 19th century. It was first spotted in Quebec in 1882. It was then later spotted in British Columbia in the 1930s.

== Gallery ==
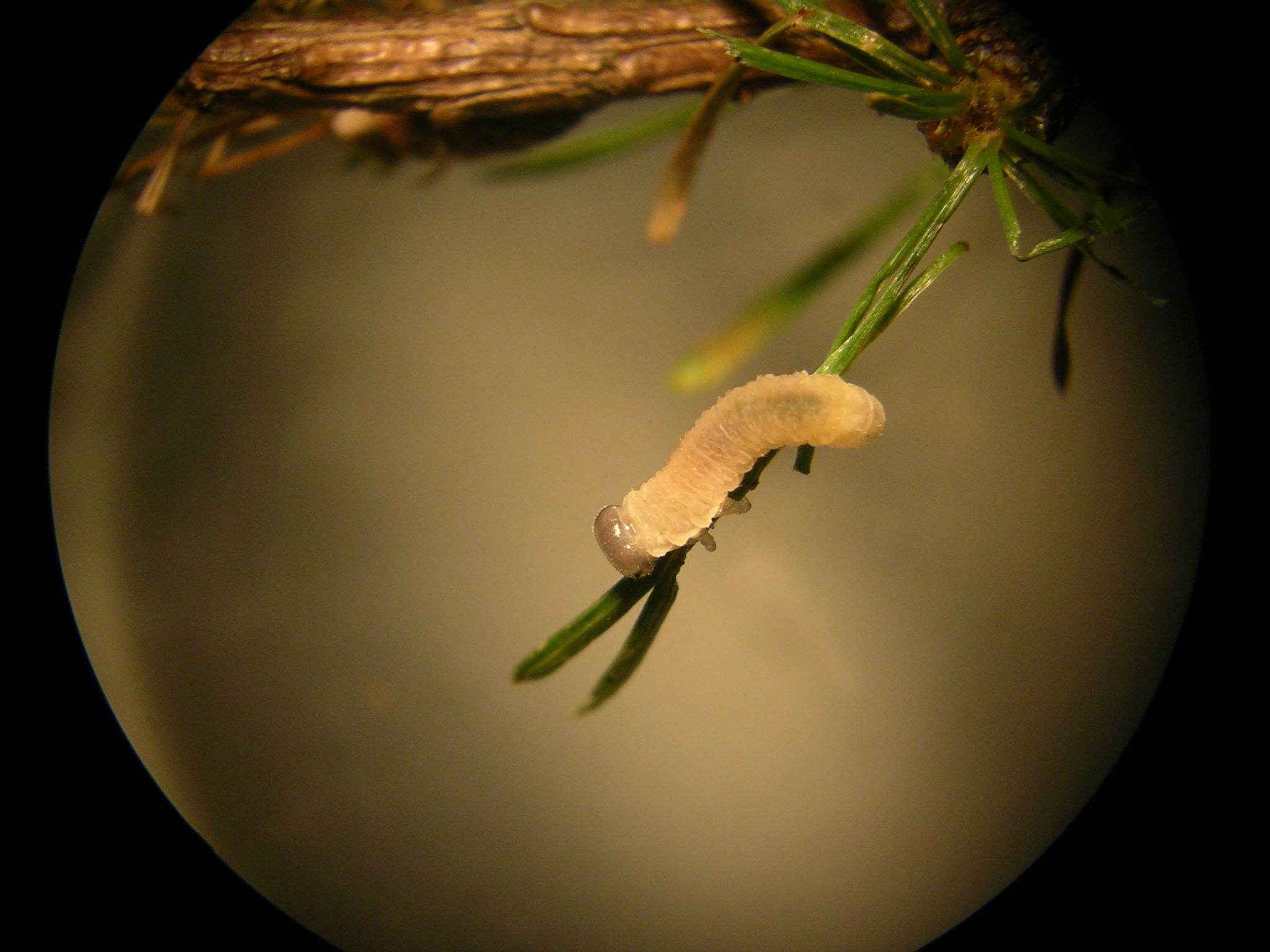
Larch sawfly, early instar larva

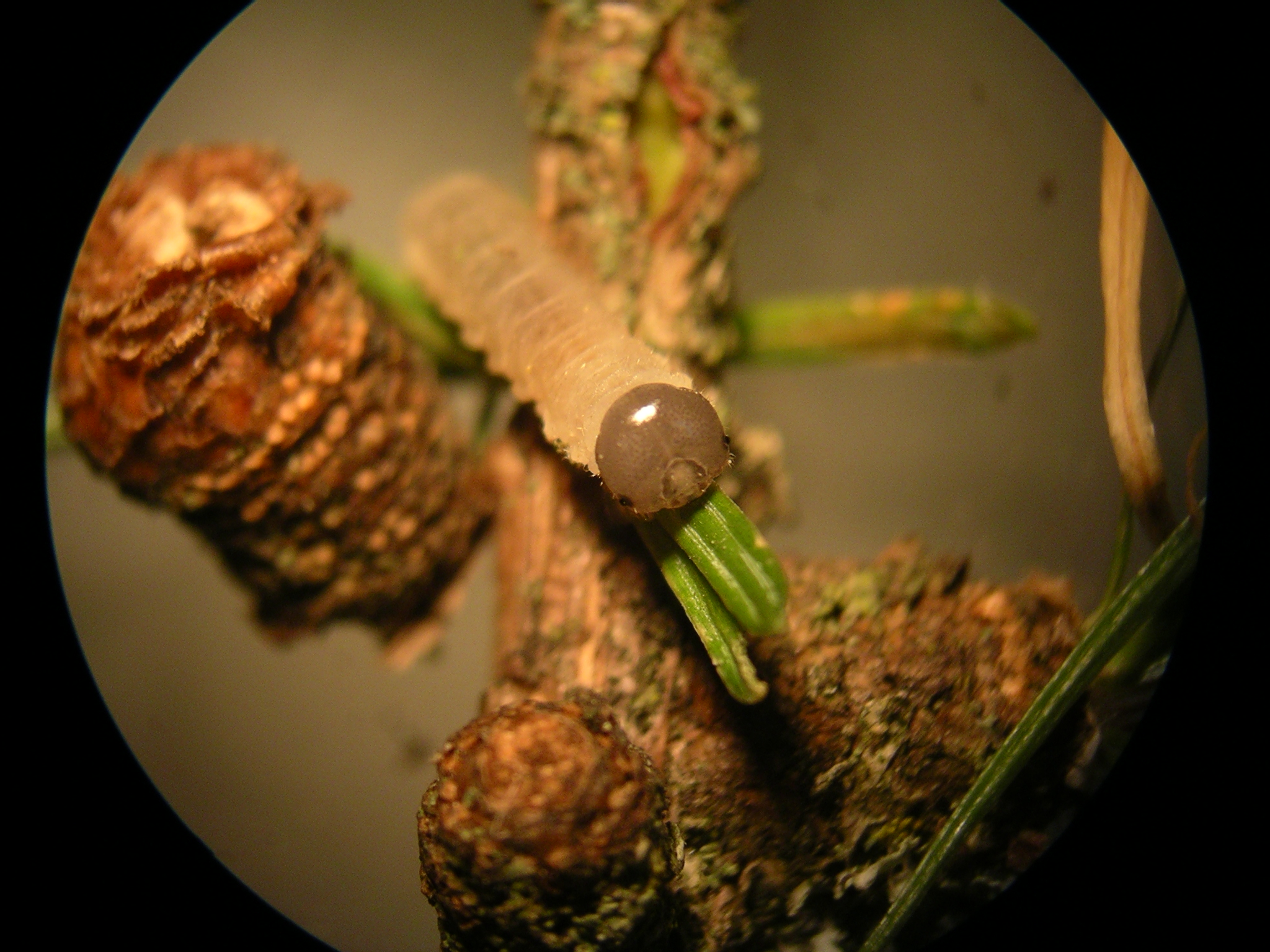
Larch sawfly, early instar larva

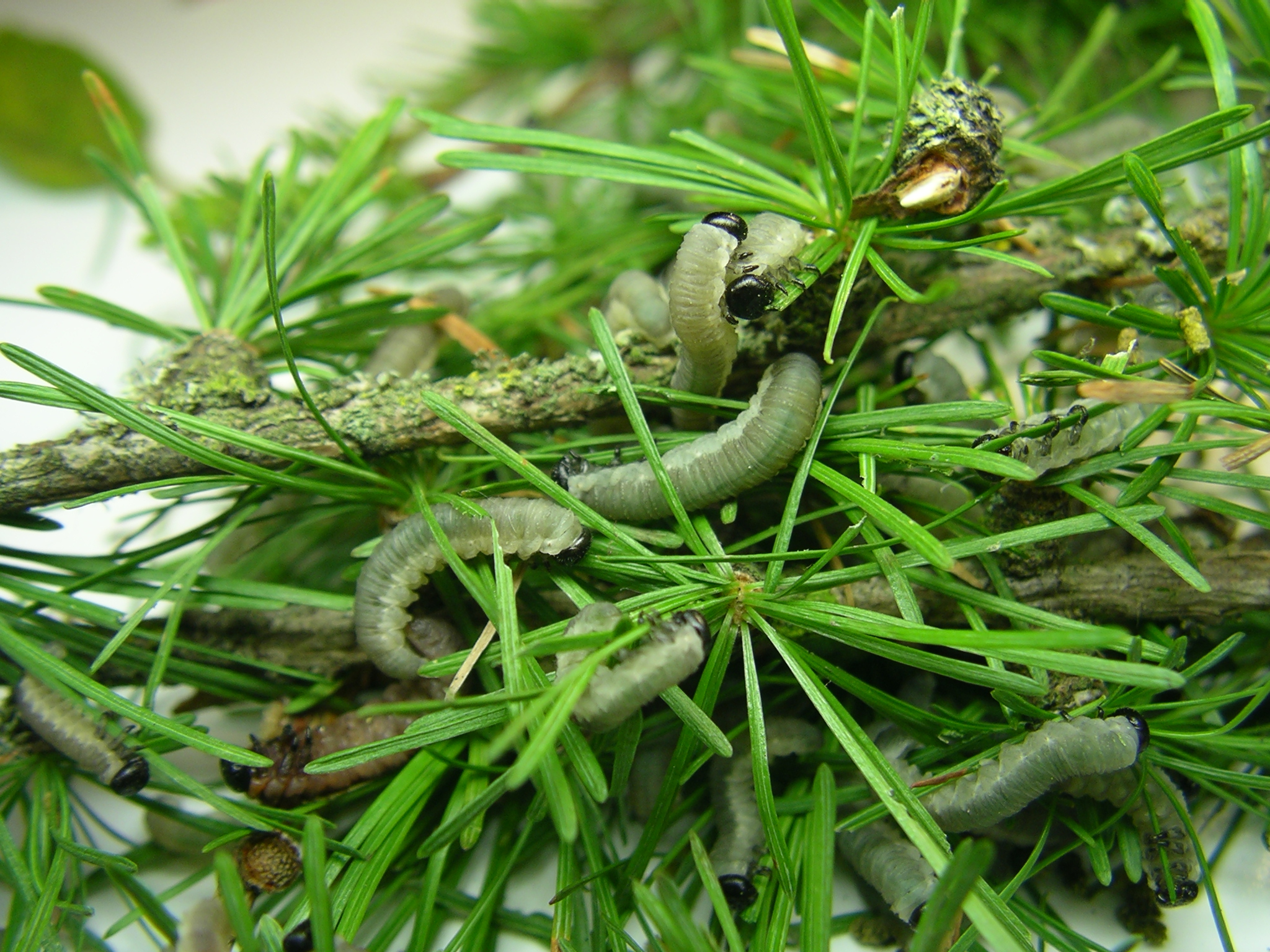
Larch sawfly, late instar larvae

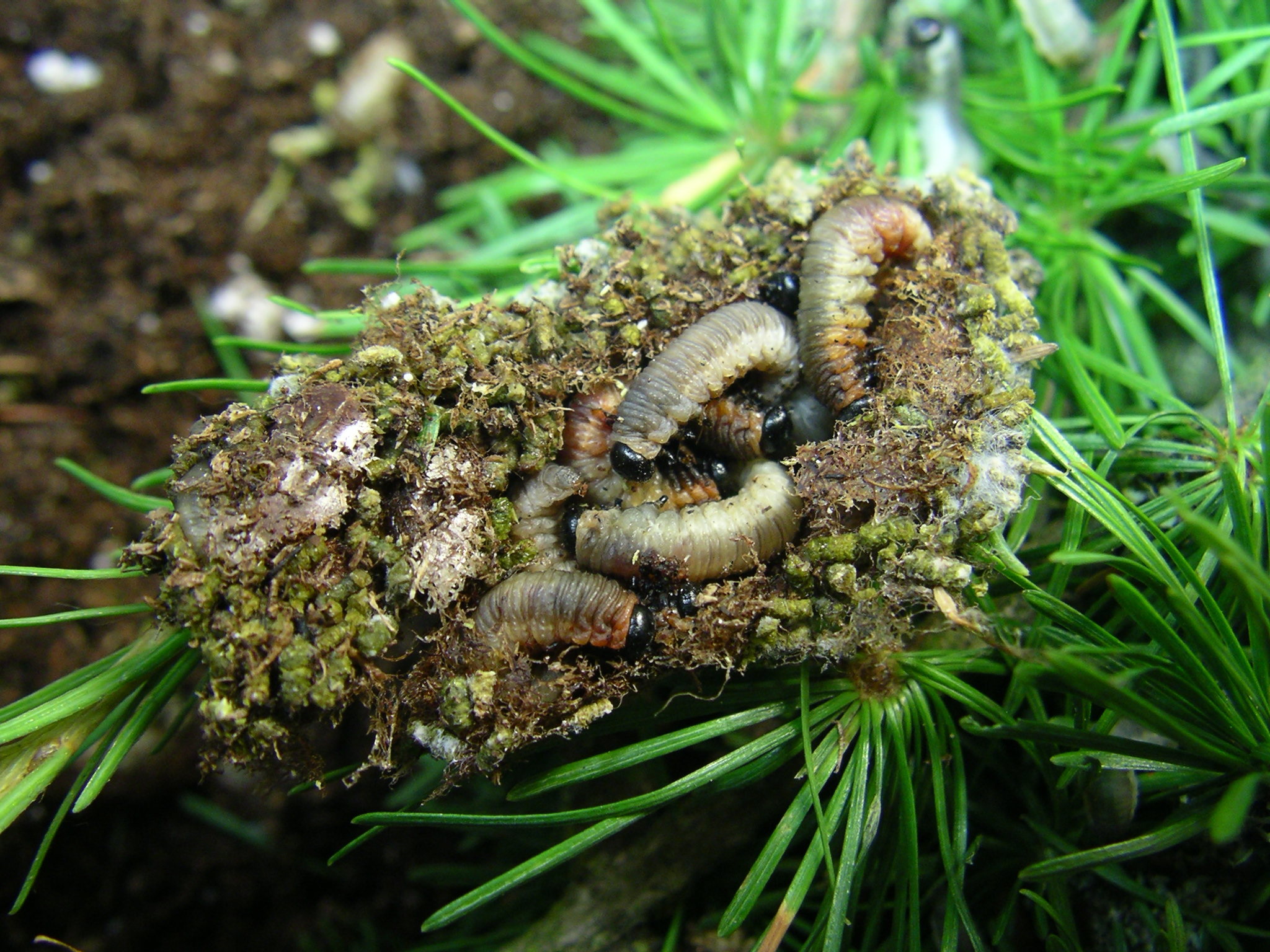
Larch sawfly larvae about to pupate

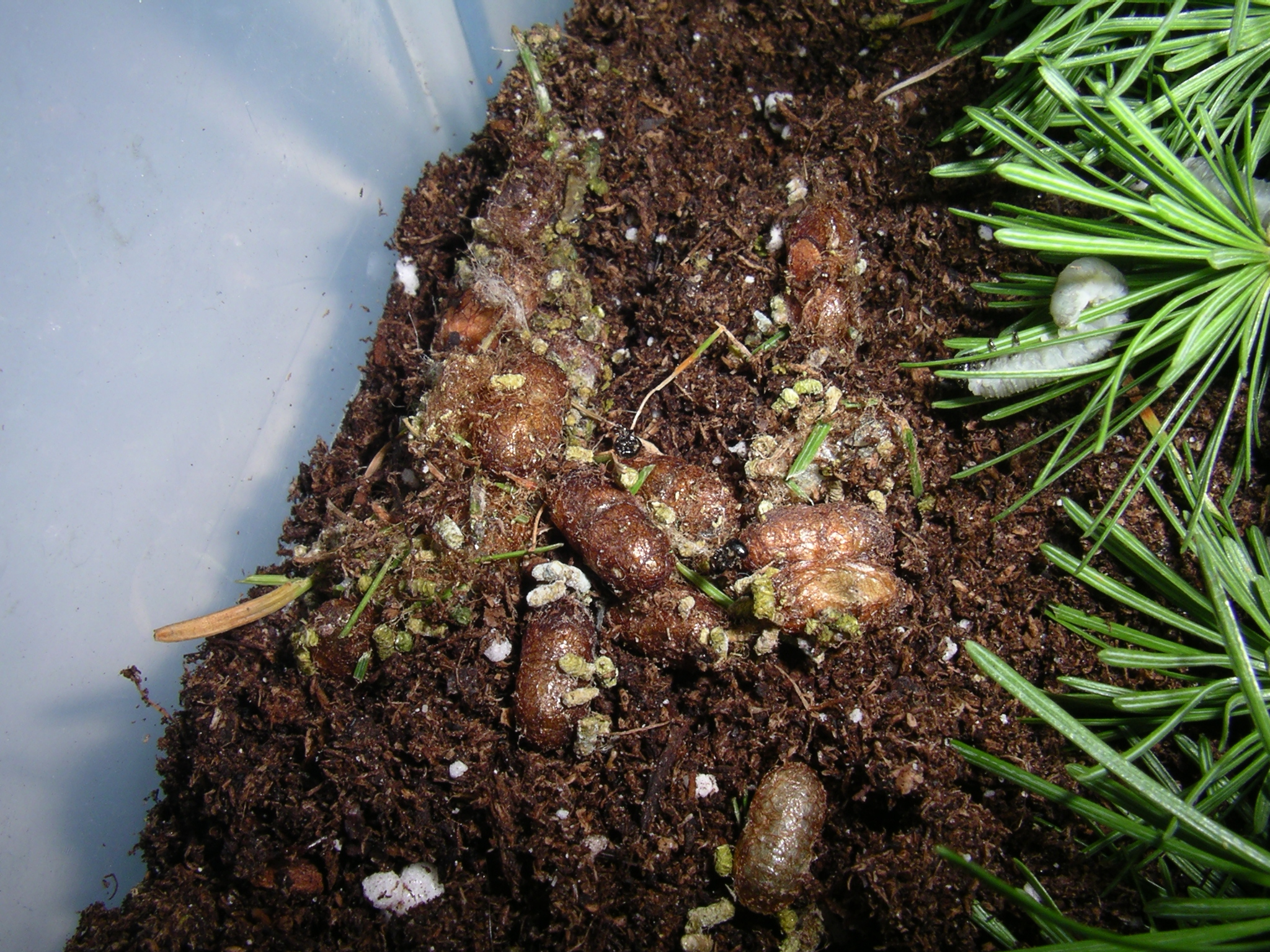
Larch sawfly pupae
