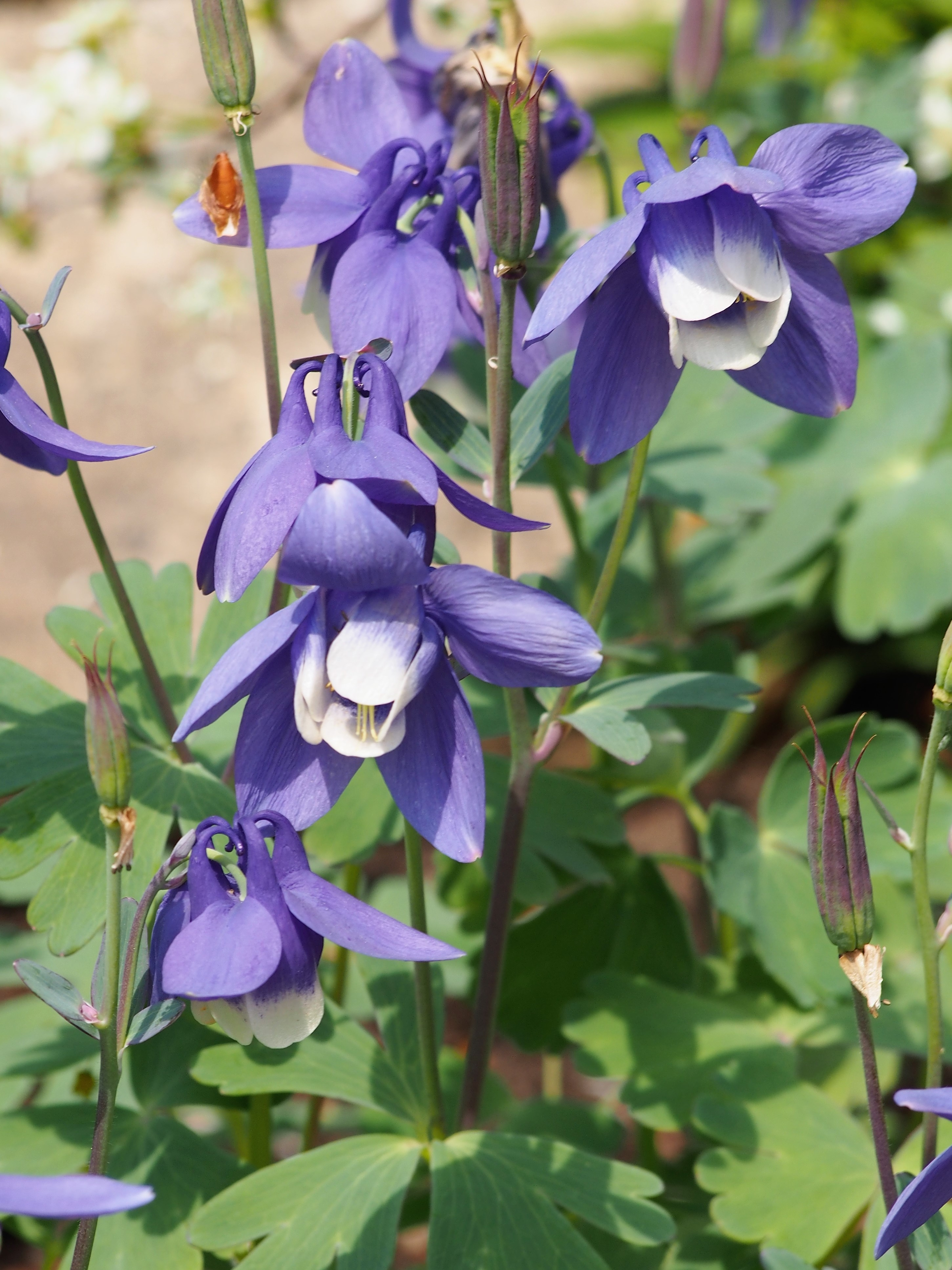

Scientific classification
- Kingdom: Plantae
- Clade: Embryophytes
- Clade: Tracheophytes
- Clade: Spermatophytes
- Clade: Angiosperms
- Clade: Eudicots
- Order: Ranunculales
- Family: Ranunculaceae
- Genus: Aquilegia
- Species: A. flabellata

Binomial name
- Aquilegia flabellata Siebold & Zucc.

Synonyms
- List: Aquilegia akitensis Huth; Aquilegia akitensis var. globularis Honda & Kishinami; Aquilegia amurensis Kom.; Aquilegia buergeriana var. pumila Huth; Aquilegia fauriei H.Lév.; Aquilegia fauriei H.Lév. & Vaniot; Aquilegia flabellata var. alpina Kuzen.; Aquilegia flabellata f. flavida (Nakai & H.Hara) Kitam.; Aquilegia flabellata f. globularis (Honda & Kishinami) Kitam.; Aquilegia flabellata var. humiliata Makino; Aquilegia flabellata f. konoi (Miyabe & Tatew.) Kitam.; Aquilegia flabellata var. protypica Takeda; Aquilegia flabellata f. pumila (Huth) Kudô; Aquilegia flabellata var. pumila (Huth) Kudô; Aquilegia glandulosa Miq.; Aquilegia japonica Nakai & H.Hara; Aquilegia japonica var. flavida Nakai & H.Hara; Aquilegia japonica f. globularis (Honda & Kishinami) Nakai & H.Hara; Aquilegia japonica f. konoi Miyabe & Tatew.; Aquilegia sibirica var. flabellata Finet & Gagnep.; Aquilegia sibirica var. japonica Rapaics; Aquilegia sibirica var. spectabilis Baker; Aquilegia spectabilis Lem.; Aquilegia vulgaris Thunb.

= Aquilegia flabellata =

Species of flowering plant

Aquilegia flabellata is a species of perennial flowering plant in the genus Aquilegia in the family Ranunculaceae. Native to North and East Asia, the species is found in China, Korea, Mongolia, the Russian Far East, and Japan. The species is commonly known as the fan columbine and some authorities, such as Flora of China, accept the species under the taxonomic name Aquilegia japonica. A dwarf variety of the species, A. flabellata var. pumila, is native to Japan. In cultivation, there are several cultivars of the species – with over 40 cultivars of A. flabellata var. pumila alone – possessing diverse physical attributes.

Within its native range, A. flabellata occurs in mountain forests and on cliffs and slopes at elevations between 1,400 m (4,600 ft) and 2,500 m (8,200 ft) above sea level. The species can grow stems which reach heights of 45 cm (18 in) tall. Flowering occurs in July within its native Chinese range. The flowers of the species's natural form feature blueish-purple sepals and petal blades that are purple, yellow-white, or white. The nectar spurs are purple and curve inwards.

The species was first described in 1846 by the German botanists Philipp Franz von Siebold and Joseph Gerhard Zuccarini.

== Description ==
Aquilegia flabellata is a perennial herbaceous flowering plant in the genus Aquilegia (columbines) in the family Ranunculaceae. Within the species, there are two naturally occurring varieties: the typical A. flabellata var. flabellata and A. flabellata var. pumila.

The species has a short taproot, from which sprout stems that can reach heights of between 15 cm (5.9 in) and 45 cm (18 in) tall on the typical A. f. flabellata. A. f. pumila stems are generally between 10 cm (3.9 in) and 15 mm (0.59 in) tall. On A. f. flabellata, the stems are between 2 mm (0.079 in) and 4 mm (0.16 in) thick at the base, while A. f. pumila stems are thinner. The stems can be unbranched or branched near the apex.

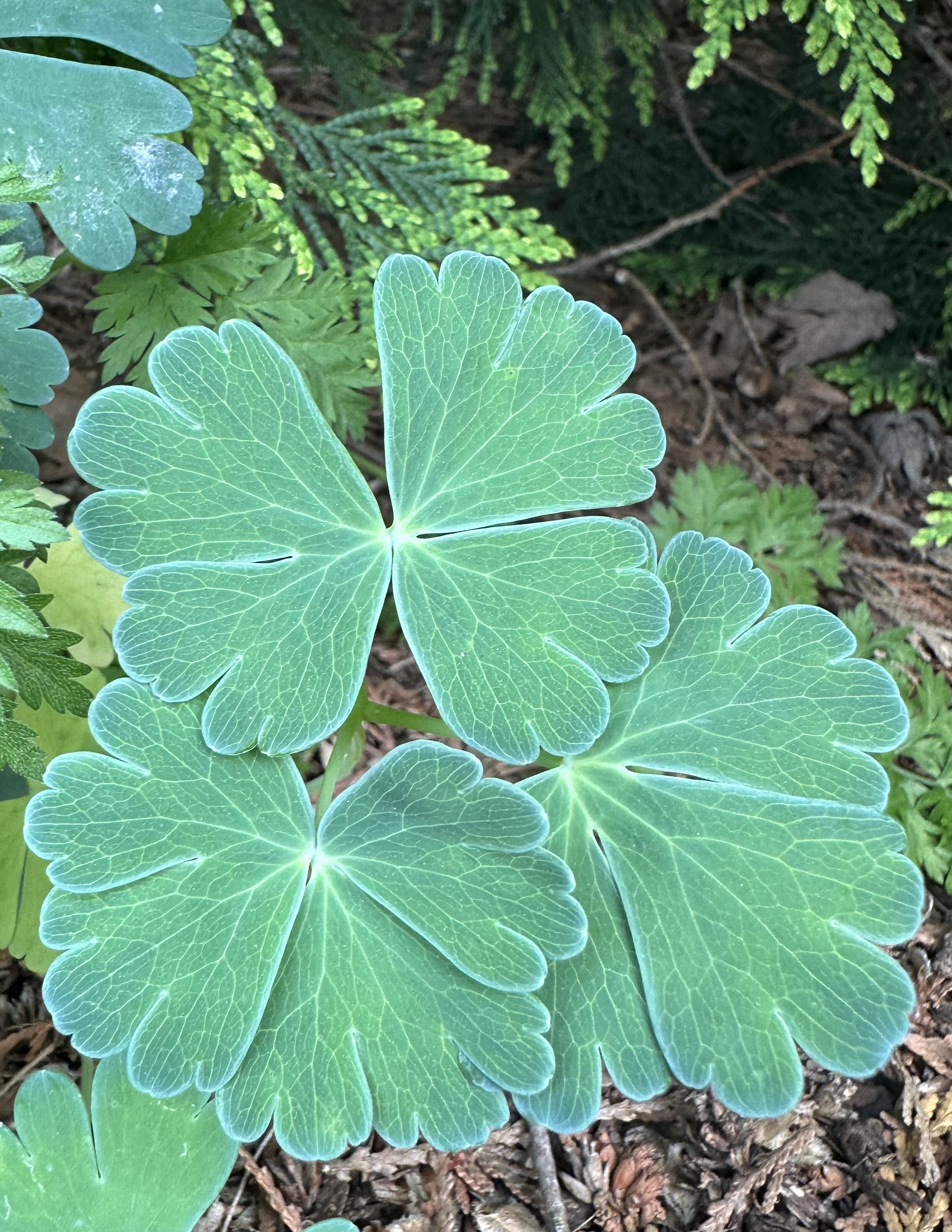
The fanning foliage of Aquilegia flabellata 'Alba'

There are basal leaves (stemming from the base of the plant) that are present in relatively small numbers. The basal leaves are generally biternate (spreading into two leaflets, each with three lobes) or, occasionally, once-ternate (one leaflet with three lobes). The leaves are borne by long petioles that are generally between 5 mm (0.20 in) and 15 mm (0.59 in) long. The stems have been described as both leafless and as presenting one to three leaves.

In its native Chinese range, flowering occurs in July. Cultivated plants in St. Petersburg, Russia, flowered in May. Each inflorescence has one to three flowers. The bracts are linear-lanceolate in shape and have one to three lobes. The flowers are nodding and have diameters of between 3.5 mm (0.14 in) and 4.2 mm (0.17 in) across. Aquilegia flowers each have five sepals and five smaller petals. Each petal has two portions: a broad portion called a blade that projects forward and an elongated base that forms a structure called a nectar spur containing nectar that projects backward.

The spreading sepals on A. flabellata are blueish-purple. Each sepal, which measures 1.5 cm (0.59 in) to 2.5 cm (0.98 in) long and 0.7 cm (0.28 in) to 1.5 cm (0.59 in) wide, has an elliptic-obovate shape that comes to a tip which can be obtuse (rounded) or subrounded. The suberect petals are purple with yellow tips, yellowish-white, or white. The spurs have lengths of between 8 mm (0.31 in) and 20 mm (0.79 in) with base widths of between 4 mm (0.16 in) and 5 mm (0.20 in). The spurs are purple and curve inward towards the tips.

Aquilegia fruit feature follicles which bear numerous seeds. The shiny, black seeds are approximately 2 mm (0.079 in) long.

== Taxonomy ==
Aquilegia flabellata was first described in 1846 by the German botanists Philipp Franz von Siebold and Joseph Gerhard Zuccarini in the journal Abhandlungen der Mathematisch-Physikalischen Klasse der Königlich Bayerischen Akademie der Wissenschaften. This description did not assign a type locality, with the American botanist Philip A. Munz writing in 1946 that he was unaware if a type specimen existed. Siebold and Zuccarini did synonymize the Swedish botanist Carl Peter Thunberg's 1784 description of Aquilegia vulgaris in the region of Edo (now Tokyo) to A. flabellata.

The Royal Botanic Gardens, Kew's Plants of the World Online (POWO) accepts the species as A. flabellata and considers both A. japonica and A. flabellata var. pumila as taxonomic synonyms.

=== Etymology ===
The word columbine, the common name for species in the genus, derives from the Latin word columbinus, meaning "dove", a reference to the flowers' appearance being similar to a group of doves. The genus name Aquilegia may come from the Latin word for "eagle", aquila, in reference to the petals' resemblance to eagle talons. A more likely etymology for Aquilegia is a derivation from the Latin aquam legere "to collect water", aquilegium (a container of water), or aquilex ("dowser" or "water-finder") in reference to the profusion of nectar in the spurs. The specific name flabellata comes from the Latin flabellatus, which means "fan-shaped".

== Distribution ==
Aquilegia flabellata has a native range in Northeast Asia that extends over portions of Northeast China, northern Japan, Korea, Mongolia, and the Russian Far East. In Russia, is found in southern Siberia, Sakhalin, and the Kuril Islands. In China, the species is found in the southern portions of the province of Heilongjiang and the eastern portions of the province of Jilin. In Japan, there are observed variance between populations which are northern and southern parts of the species's range, which includes the largest Japanese island of Honshu.

A. flabellata is an alpine species that favors temperate biomes. Within its range, the species is located within mountain forests and on cliffs and slopes at elevations between 1,400 m (4,600 ft) and 2,500 m (8,200 ft) above sea level. Beach populations were observed on Rebun Island in Japan.

As of 2025, the POWO predicted the conservation status of A. flabellata as not threatened with a confidence level as "confident".

== Cultivation ==
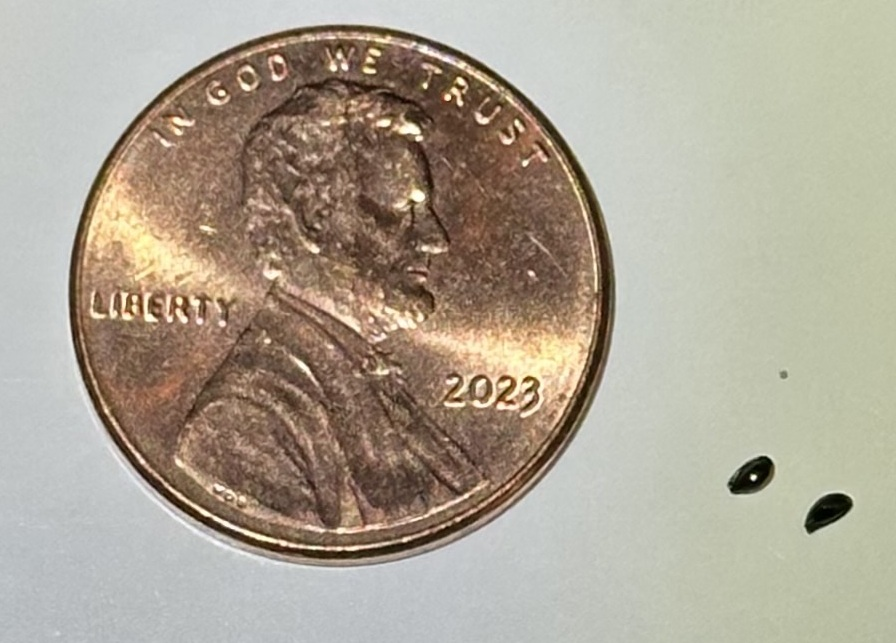
Commercially acquired A. f. pumila 'Alba' seeds

Aquilegia are grown as garden plants, with several species that are regularly grown for different types of gardens. Aquilegia flabellata is popular for gardens and is grown as an ornamental plant. The species is popular with plant breeders, with a large number of horticultural forms – known as cultivars – available. Of A. f. pumila alone, there are more than 40 culitvars. Plants labelled Aquilegia akitensis – which the American botanist and gardener Robert Nold called "very beautiful, desirable plants" – are derived from A. f. pumila.

In cultivation, A. flabellata will flower from seed the year after it was sowed. Deadheading (removing dead flowers) before a plant expends the energy necessary to produce seeds can extend the lifespan of any columbine. Due to their capacity to self-sow, Aquilegia can become invasive.

As with other columbines, cultivated A. flabellata are susceptible to leaf miners. The columbine sawfly is known to consume A. flabellata leaves. Other pests that A. flabellata may also be susceptible to are aphids, aquilegia gall midge, and caterpillars. Both powdery mildews and the aquilegia downy mildew may also adversely affect the species.

=== Cultivars ===
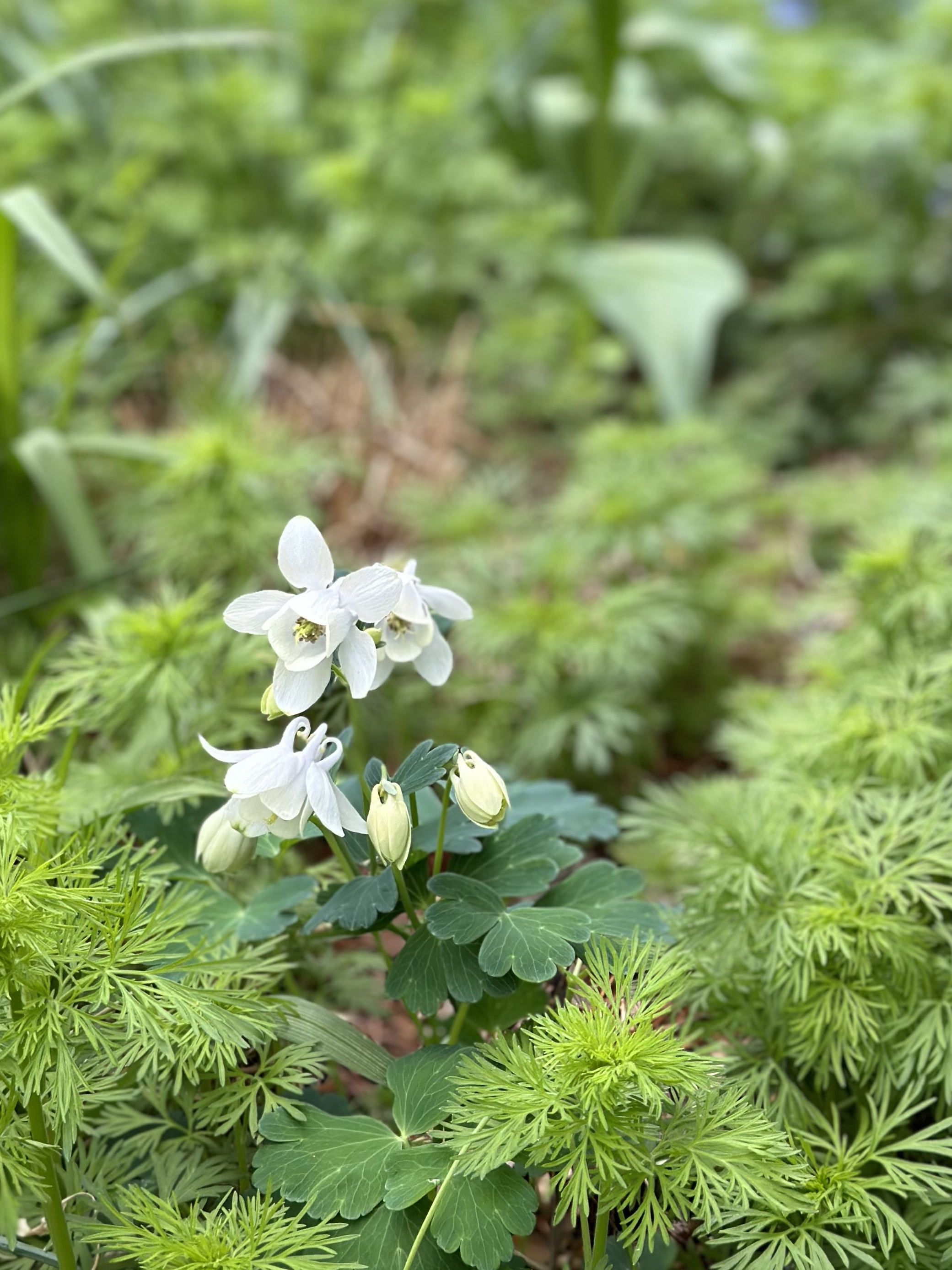
'Alba' is a white-flowering cultivar of the species.

In 1946, Munz reported three varieties of the species available in the horticultural trade: A. f. flabellata, var. alba, and var. nana (also nana-alba). While the latter two have been sold as varieties into the 21st century, they are now technically considered cultivars, with 'Alba' (also 'Nana Alba') being derived from A. f. pumila and 'Nana' largely the same as A. f. pumila. Similarly, plants described as A. flabellata var. kurilensis and var. sachalinensis are not taxonomic varieties but horticultural plants with little to no variance from the typical form.

'Alba' is a compact form of the plant that only reaches about 15 cm (6 in) to 20 cm (8 in) tall. The nodding flowers are white with short, inward-curving spurs. 'Rosea' (sometimes called A. kitensis var. rosea or 'Kurilensis Rosea') are 7.5 cm (3 in) to 15 cm (6 in) tall and possess dwarf flowers that are pink. Nold called 'Rosea' "as beautiful as a columbine needs to be".
