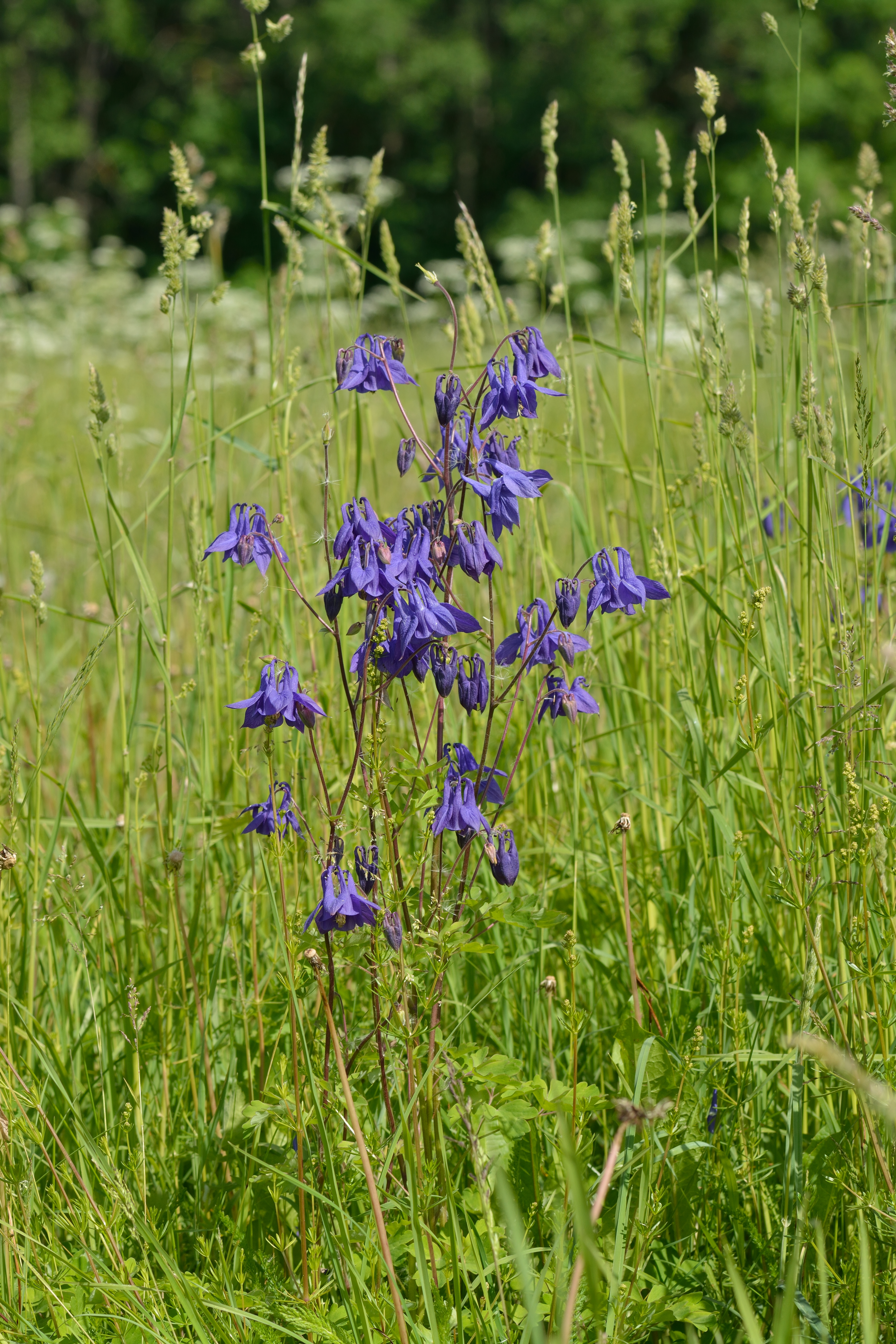

Scientific classification
- Kingdom: Plantae
- Clade: Tracheophytes
- Clade: Angiosperms
- Clade: Eudicots
- Order: Ranunculales
- Family: Ranunculaceae
- Genus: Aquilegia
- Species: A. vulgaris

Binomial name
- Aquilegia vulgaris L.

Synonyms
- List: Aquilegia alba Huftelen; Aquilegia arbascensis Timb.-Lagr.; Aquilegia atrata W.D.J.Koch; Aquilegia collina Jord.; Aquilegia corniculata Vill.; Aquilegia cornuta Gilib.; Aquilegia cyclophylla Jeanb. & Timb.-Lagr.; Aquilegia ebneri Zimmeter; Aquilegia ecalcarata Steud.; Aquilegia elegans Pope ex Steud.; Aquilegia eynensis Brühl; Aquilegia glaucescens Baker; Aquilegia glaucophylla Steud.; Aquilegia haenkeana W.D.J.Koch ex Maly; Aquilegia inversa Mill.; Aquilegia mollis Jeanb. ex Timb.-Lagr.; Aquilegia nemoralis Jord.; Aquilegia nivea Baumg.; Aquilegia platysepala Rchb.; Aquilegia plena Steud.; Aquilegia praecox Jord.; Aquilegia recticornu Brühl; Aquilegia ruscinonensis Timb.-Lagr. & Jeanb.; Aquilegia silvestris Neck.; Aquilegia speciosa Timb.-Lagr.; Aquilegia stellata Steud.; Aquilegia sternbergiana Rchb. ex W.D.J.Koch; Aquilegia subalpina Boreau; Aquilegia sylvestris Schur; Aquilegia versicolor Salisb.; Aquilegia vulgaris subsp. subalpina (Boreau) B.Bock; Aquilegia winterbottomiana Brühlv; Aquilina vulgaris (L.) Bubani

= Aquilegia vulgaris =

Species of flowering plant

Aquilegia vulgaris is a species of perennial flowering plant of the genus Aquilegia (columbine) in the family Ranunculaceae. Commonly called the common columbine, European crowfoot, and granny's bonnet, it presently possesses the most expansive range and greatest morphological variability in its genus. The current wild range of A. vulgaris includes its native range in Europe as well as introduced populations in Asia, Oceania, North America (where it has become naturalized), and South America.

The wild form of A. vulgaris grow flowering stems that can reach 90 cm (35 in) tall and often form a bushy clump at its base. In its native range, the species blooms from May to June. The flowers, with diameters measuring up to 60 mm (2.4 in) across, are typically blue or purple and possess petals with structures known as nectar spurs.

Associated with fertility goddesses in ancient Greece and ancient Rome, archaeological evidence suggests A. vulgaris was in cultivation by the 2nd century AD in Roman Britain. The species represented virtuous behaviour, the Holy Spirit, and the Trinity within Christian art; in other contexts, such as William Shakespeare's Hamlet, A. vulgaris was a malevolent symbol. While it has been treated as an herbal remedy since the Middle Ages, some chemicals within the plant are toxic to humans. The species was given its scientific binomial name by Carl Linnaeus in his 1753 Species Plantarum.

Some horticultural varieties, known as cultivars, that were developed by the 16th century have remained popular with gardeners. Cultivars of A. vulgaris have continued to be developed, as have hybrids crossing it with other columbines. The resulting plants produce an array of colours and double-flowered examples.

== Description ==
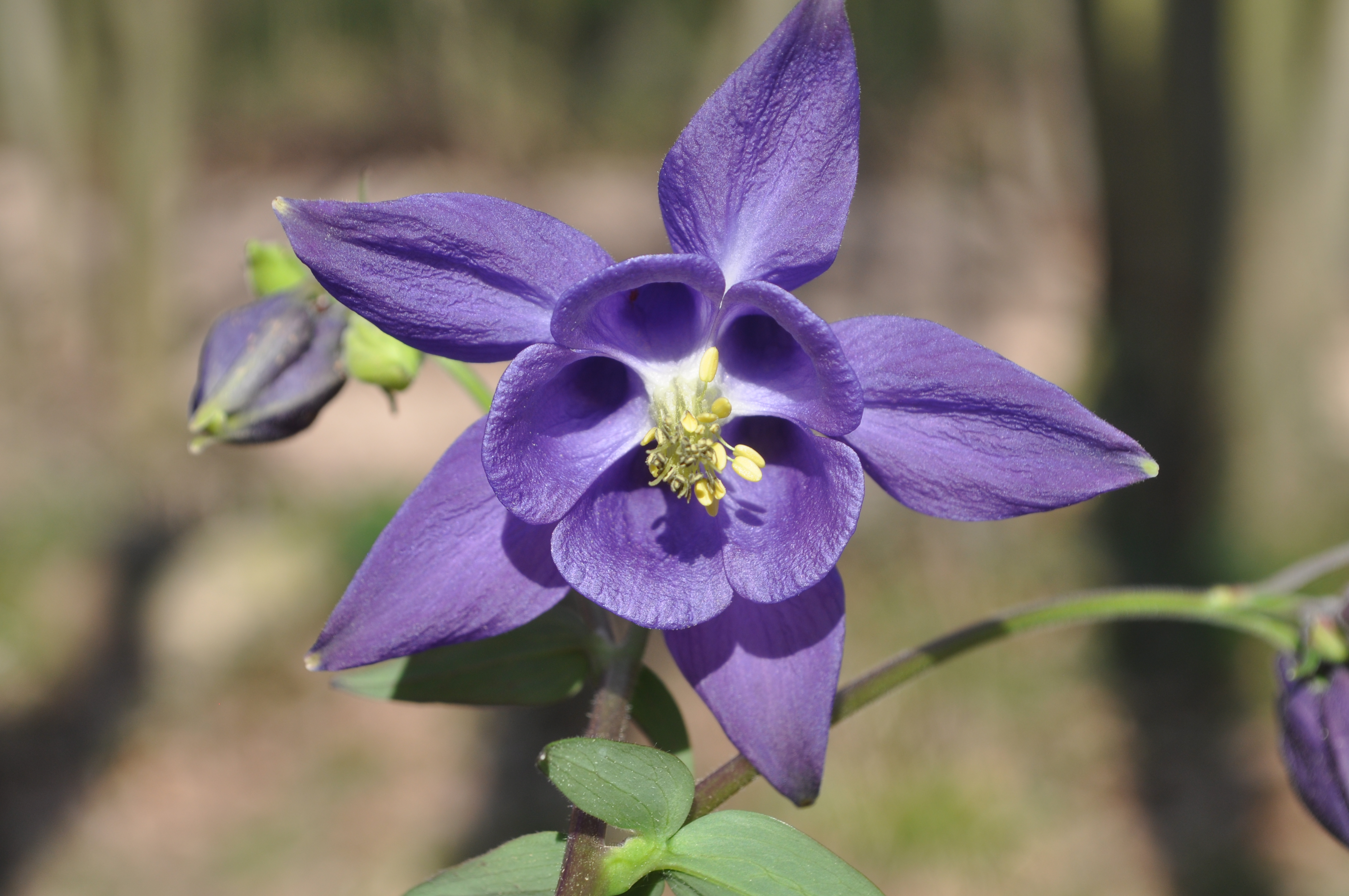
The interior structure of an Aquilegia vulgaris flower

A floral diagram of A. vulgaris

Aquilegia vulgaris is a perennial herbaceous flowering plant of the genus Aquilegia in the family Ranunculaceae. An A. vulgaris plant possesses a thick rootstock that can be either simple or branched, with one or two flowering stems. A. vulgaris plants often form bushy clumps from which their thin stems project upward. The aerial stems grow between 50 cm (20 in) and 90 cm (35 in) tall and can be between 3 mm (0.12 in) and 5 mm (0.20 in) wide at their bases. These stems are leafy and are pubescent (covered in hairs). The hairs are whitish and are absent on some plants of the species. The branches from the stems are glabrous (covered in glands) and pubescent, with the top portions of the plant showing more pubescence than the lower portions. The hairs are small and whitish.

The basal leaves (leaves attached to the base of the plant) are present in large quantities and can reach between 22 cm (8.7 in) and 40 cm (16 in) in length when including their petioles. The petioles themselves can reach between 14 cm (5.5 in) and 27 cm (11 in) in length. These leaves are biternate, with each leaflet itself subdivided in three. The thin leaf blades of the basal leaves are glabrous on their top sides. They are glaucous (pale blue-grey) and pubescent beneath. There are also cauline leaves (leaves attached to an aerial stem) which are borne on petioles between 0.1 cm (0.039 in) and 11 cm (4.3 in) in length. The cauline leaves, which appear singularly or in pairs, are similar to the basal leaves but become smaller and simplified the further up a stem they appear.

Wild A. vulgaris plants flower between May and June in their native range. In North America, where A. vulgaris is naturalized, plants flower with a spring to summer bloom from May to July. The inflorescences of the species can feature between three and eighteen flowers. The bracts are a bit glabrous or scarcely pubescent and are downy beneath. The bracts split into three segments that are each lanceolate in shape. The peduncles are particularly downy and are densely covered by small hair-like structures called trichomes.

Wild A. vulgaris flowers, particularly those sometimes accepted as Aquilegia vulgaris subsp. vulgaris, are typically blue or purple, with rare examples of white and reddish flowers. The flowers are in a nodding orientation (facing downwards) and reach between 30 mm (1.2 in) and 60 mm (2.4 in) in diameter. The primary flowers of an inflorescence are proportionally larger – possessing flowers considered medium- to small-sized within the genus – than the secondary flowers of that inflorescence.

A. vulgaris reproductive organs

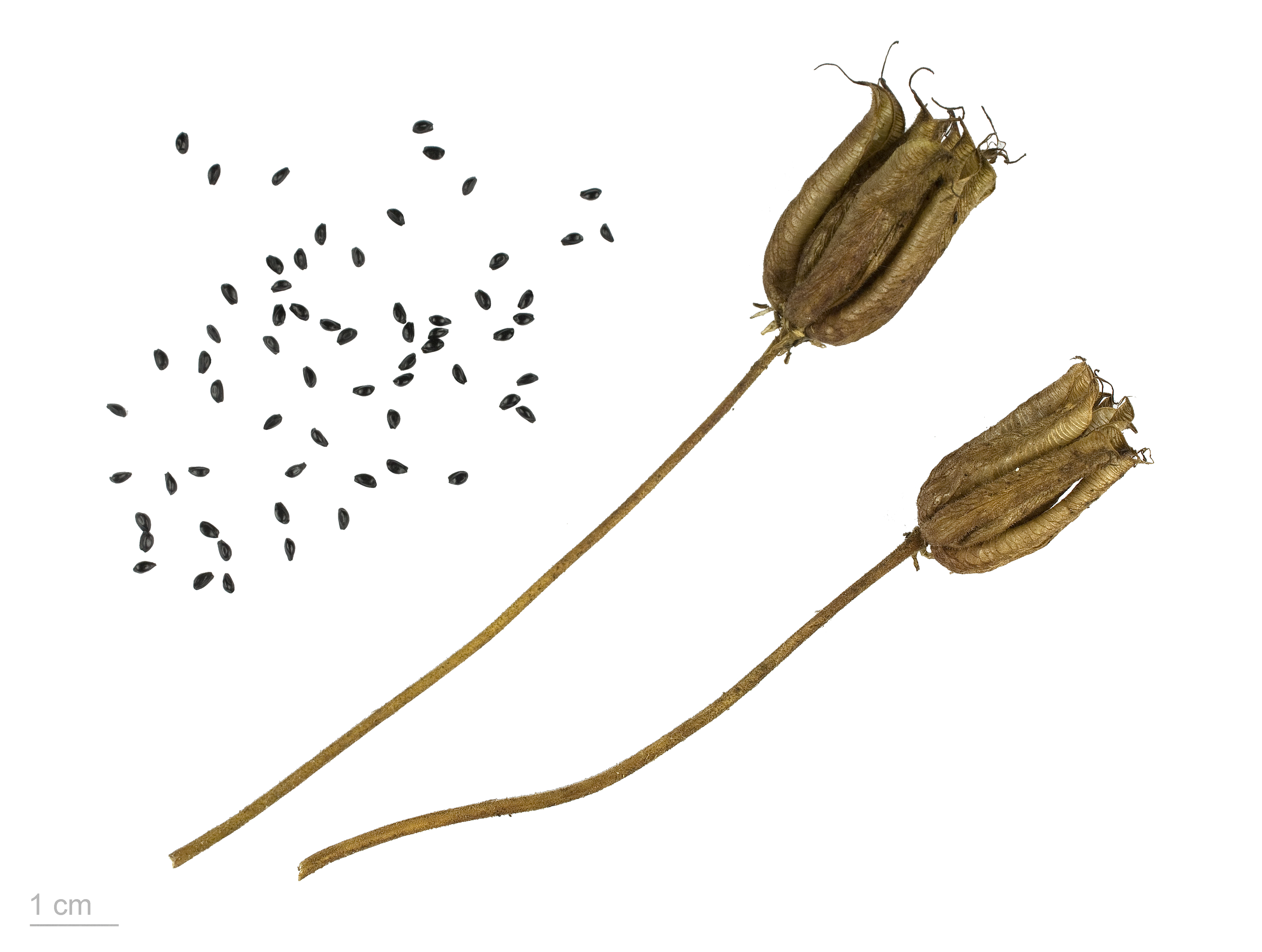
A. vulgaris fruit and seeds

The five petaloid sepals of the flower can be oriented divergent from or perpendicular to the floral axis. These sepals are ovate to ovate-lanceolate in shape, coming to acute tips. The sepals of a flower are shorter than its petals, measuring between 15 mm (0.59 in) and 30 mm (1.2 in) long and 6 mm (0.24 in) to 16 mm (0.63 in) wide. The inner structure of the flowers form a cup-like appearance.

Wild Aquilegia vulgaris, as with other Aquilegia, have five petals which possess nectar spurs, a form of nectar-bearing structure. The petals are medium-sized within the genus and are isotropic, with lengths and widths of between 22 mm (0.87 in) and 34 mm (1.3 in). The broad portion (the limb) of the petal is shorter than its nectar spur. The limbs have broad, rounded ends and measure 10 mm (0.39 in) to 14 mm (0.55 in) long and 8 mm (0.31 in) to 13 mm (0.51 in) wide. The obconical spurs can be hooked or, more rarely, curved. The spurs range in length from 12 mm (0.47 in) to 20 mm (0.79 in) long and are between 4 mm (0.16 in) and 8 mm (0.31 in) at their opening (the throat). The spurs have an even taper as they narrow towards their ends.

Each flower features multiple stamens, which measure between 9 mm (0.35 in) and 13 mm (0.51 in) long. The fruit of the plant are follicles which are between 15 mm (0.59 in) and 25 mm (0.98 in) long. Members of Aquilegia produce large quantities of seeds, which are black. A. vulgaris seeds have shiny surfaces and lack elaiosome (a fleshy mass present on some seeds). The species's seeds are between 2.2 mm (0.087 in) and 2.5 mm (0.098 in) long and have been recorded as weighing 1.53 mg (0.0236 gr). The plant's chromosome number is 2n=14.

== Ecology ==
Aphids are known to attack columbines. This is particularly the case for A. vulgaris and hybrids closely related to it. Aphid infestations can result in stunted growth, sticky honeydew accumulations on the basal leaves, and flowers that are deformed or fail to open.

Pollination can be achieved through pollinators visiting flowers to access the nectar stored in the spurs. Studies across European A. vulgaris populations have long identified visitation by bumblebees (Bombus). Hummingbirds have also been observed to visit cultivated specimens of the species.

== Phytochemistry ==
Aquilegia with cyanophores (cells that produce a blue colour), including A. vulgaris, have been observed to contain the cyanogenic glycoside compounds dhurrin and triglochinin. Cyanogenic glycosides generally taste bitter and can be toxic to animals and humans. Ingestion of 20 g (0.71 oz) of fresh A. vulgaris leaves by a human was observed as causing convulsions, respiratory distress, and heart failure. A child who consumed 12 A. vulgaris flowers experienced weakness of the limbs, cyanosis, drowsiness, and miosis; all symptoms abated after three hours.

The Royal Botanic Gardens, Kew's Useful Plants and Fungi of Colombia project has identified A. vulgaris as poisonous. An acute toxicity test in mice showed that ethanol extract and the main flavonoid compound isocytisoside from the leaves and stems of the species can be classified as nontoxic since a dose of 3000 mg/kg did not cause mortality in mice. Nicholas Culpeper recommended the seeds taken in wine to speed the process of childbirth. In modern herbal medicine it is used as an astringent and diuretic.

== Taxonomy ==
The first reliable descriptions of Aquilegia vulgaris were written by medieval European mystics and scientists including the 12th-century abbess Hildegard of Bingen – who considered the plant's herbal functions – and the 13th-century friar Albertus Magnus. The binomial name Aquilegia vulgaris was assigned by the Swedish biologist Carl Linnaeus in his 1753 book Species Plantarum.

A vulgaris is the most morphologically variable species of Aquilegia. It is also at the head of a species complex that comprises the majority of European Aquilegia, with a minority morphologically aligning with the Aquilegia alpina complex. The A. vulgaris complex is typified as possessing longer spurs than other Eurasian species, an adaptation suited to pollination by bumblebees with longer tongues. This difference in pollination adaptations corresponds with the distinction between the North American Aquilegia complexes: Aquilegia canadensis is adapted to hummingbird pollination and the Aquilegia coerulea complex is adapted to moth pollination.

=== Etymology ===
The genus name Aquilegia may come from the Latin word for "eagle", aquila, in reference to the petals' resemblance to eagle talons. A more likely etymology for Aquilegia is a derivation from the Latin aquam legere "to collect water", aquilegium (a container of water), or aquilex ("dowser" or "water-finder") in reference to the profusion of nectar in the spurs. The specific name vulgaris is Latin for "common".

Common names for the species include the common columbine, European crowfoot, and granny's bonnet. The word columbine, the common name for species in the genus, derives from the Latin word columba, meaning "dove", a reference to the flowers' appearance being similar to a group of doves. The name granny's bonnet is derived from the petals' resemblance to bonnets.

== Distribution ==
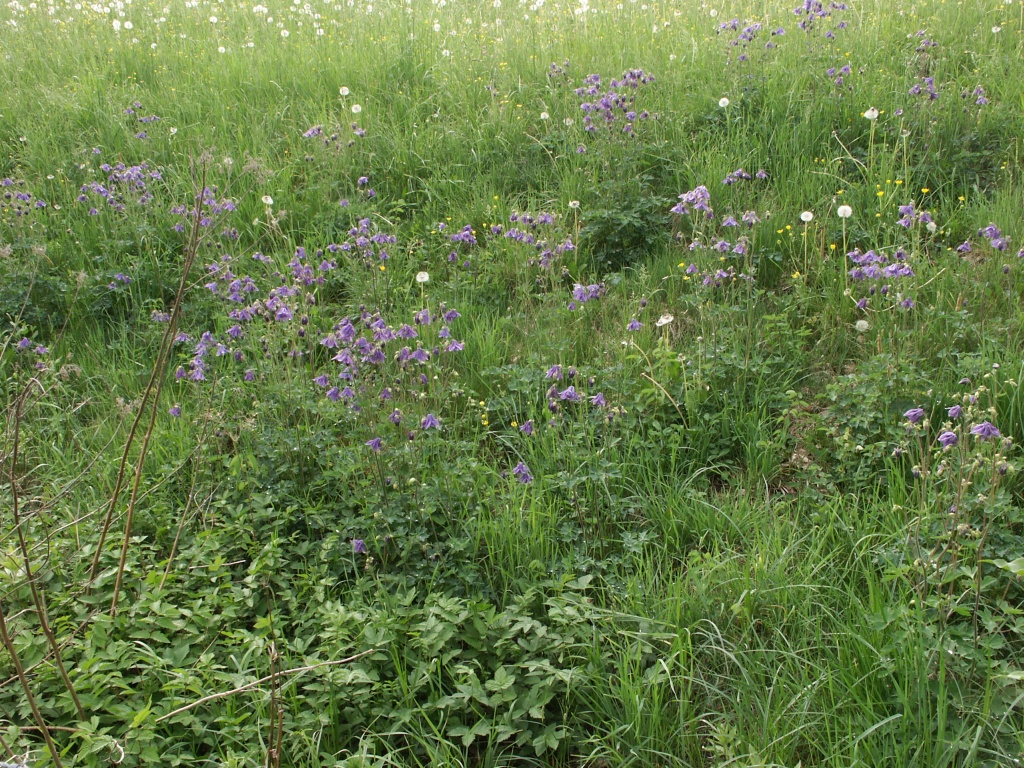
A. vulgaris growing in a meadow

Originally a European species, Aquilegia vulgaris possibly originated in the Balkans. It has since spread to become the most widely distributed Aquilegia species. Its range has expanded – both through natural radiation and human assistance – to include introduced populations that have sometimes become naturalized in Africa, Macaronesia, the Americas, and Oceania. The species is also present in Asia, with populations in the Russian Far East and Uzbekistan. These introduced populations typically originated from ornamental cultivation.

In Europe, the species ranges northward into southern Scandinavia and England. The boundaries of the species's distribution in northern Europe, simplified by the fact that A. vulgaris is the exclusive member of the genus in this region, have been understood since the 19th century. The southern European distribution of the species is less defined, as its radiation through the Iberian, Italian, and Balkan peninsulas has brought it into contact with other columbines in that region, leading to introgressive hybridization. The species also ranges east into western Russia. Aquilegia ballii, sometimes considered a variety of A. vulgaris, inhabits the Atlas Mountains and is the only Aquilegia in Africa.

The American gardener Robert Nold said that there was little evidence the species's had been absent in any part of Europe prior to it entering cultivation and that its expansion on the continent was a natural process. He also said categorizing any European populations of A. vulgaris as naturalized rather than as native were poorly justified. The Royal Botanic Gardens, Kew's Plants of the World Online (POWO) records the species as native to Albania, Austria, the Balkans, the Baltic states, Belarus, Belgium, the British Isles, Bulgaria, Corsica, continental France, Germany, the Iberians and Italian peninsulas, the Low Countries, Poland, Sicily, Switzerland, and parts of European Russia. POWO considers the populations in Denmark, the Caucasus, Scandinavia, Ukraine, and portions of European Russian as introduced.

The Italian botanist Enio Nardi considered several hypotheses for how A. vulgaris reached the British Isles. The hypothesis suggesting the earliest arrival time suggests the plant spread over a plateau that connected the British Isles to Continental Europe during the Late Miocene (prior to 5.333 million years ago). Other hypotheses suggest a later arrival, including during Quaternary glaciations or as recently as within the period of recorded history.

Introduced populations of A. vulgaris live in Macaronesia, a series of archipelagos in the Atlantic Ocean off the North African and European coasts. The species has been repeatedly recorded as present on the Azores, Canary Islands, and Madeira since at least 1932. On Tenerife, one of the Canary Islands, the plant has been reported as present since at least 1974.

The species is naturalized in North America, where it escaped from cultivation as an ornamental plant. It is established within cooler environments on the continent. While most of the naturalized populations are the wild form with blue or purple flowers, others descend from horticultural forms with white, red, or pink flowers. Some forms of the species present on the continent are likely the descendants of hybrids between A. vulgaris and other Aquilegia. Populations of A. vulgaris exist on both the Pacific and Atlantic coasts of Canada and the United States, with naturalized populations established in the northern Midwestern United States by the first decade of the 20th century. A. vulgaris was among several foreign species proposed as the national flowers of the United States during the early 20th century.

In Oceania, the species has been introduced to New South Wales, Tasmania, and Victoria in Australia and both the North and South Islands of New Zealand. Introduced populations have been recorded in South America since at least 1845, when it was recorded as present in Chilean cultivation. A. vulgaris populations in Chilea and Argentina have both been recorded in the 21st century.

== Cultivation ==
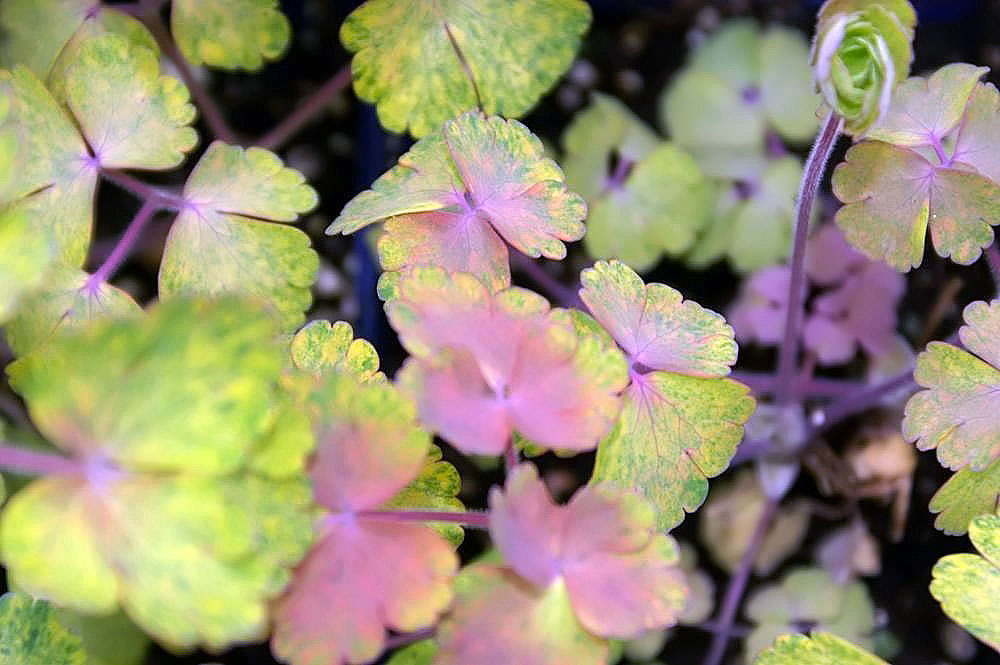
Foliage of Aquilegia vulgaris 'Leprechaun Gold'

Archaeobotanical evidence suggests that Aquilegia vulgaris was cultivated for ornamental purposes in 3rd-century AD Roman Britain. The discoveries of singular A. vulgaris seeds in burnt waste pits at Alcester and Leicester have been interpreted as evidence of their planting in gardens. Finds of columbines at a late Saxon site near Winchester Cathedral and three later medieval German sites have also been interpreted as using the plant for gardening. In 12th-century Italy, people may have supported A. vulgaris or Aquilegia atrata populations near religious structures, possibly due to the contemporary treatment of columbines as Christian symbols.

By the 16th century, selectively bred horticultural A. vulgaris were being recorded in Europe. Linnaeus made mention of some horticultural A. vulgaris when describing the species in 1753 in what was a rare inclusion of cultivated plants within his work. Presently, A. vulgaris is a frequently cultivated garden plant, though the wild form of the species is rare in such settings. It is most commonly grown in its many cultivated forms, known as cultivars. Some of these cultivars were developed centuries ago and remain popular among gardeners in the northern parts of the globe. Some cultivars produce particular colours, while others were bred as double-flowered plants where stamens produce petals or have sepal-like perianths.

The species is suited to sunny and partially shaded settings within USDA hardiness zones 3 through 10. A. vulgaris plants generally only live three or four years in garden settings and can be interpreted as having biennial-like lifespans. Within their lifetime, each plant can produce dozens of seedlings. Deadheading (removing dead flowers) before a plant expends the energy necessary to produce seeds can extend the lifespan of any columbine.

=== Cultivars and varieties ===
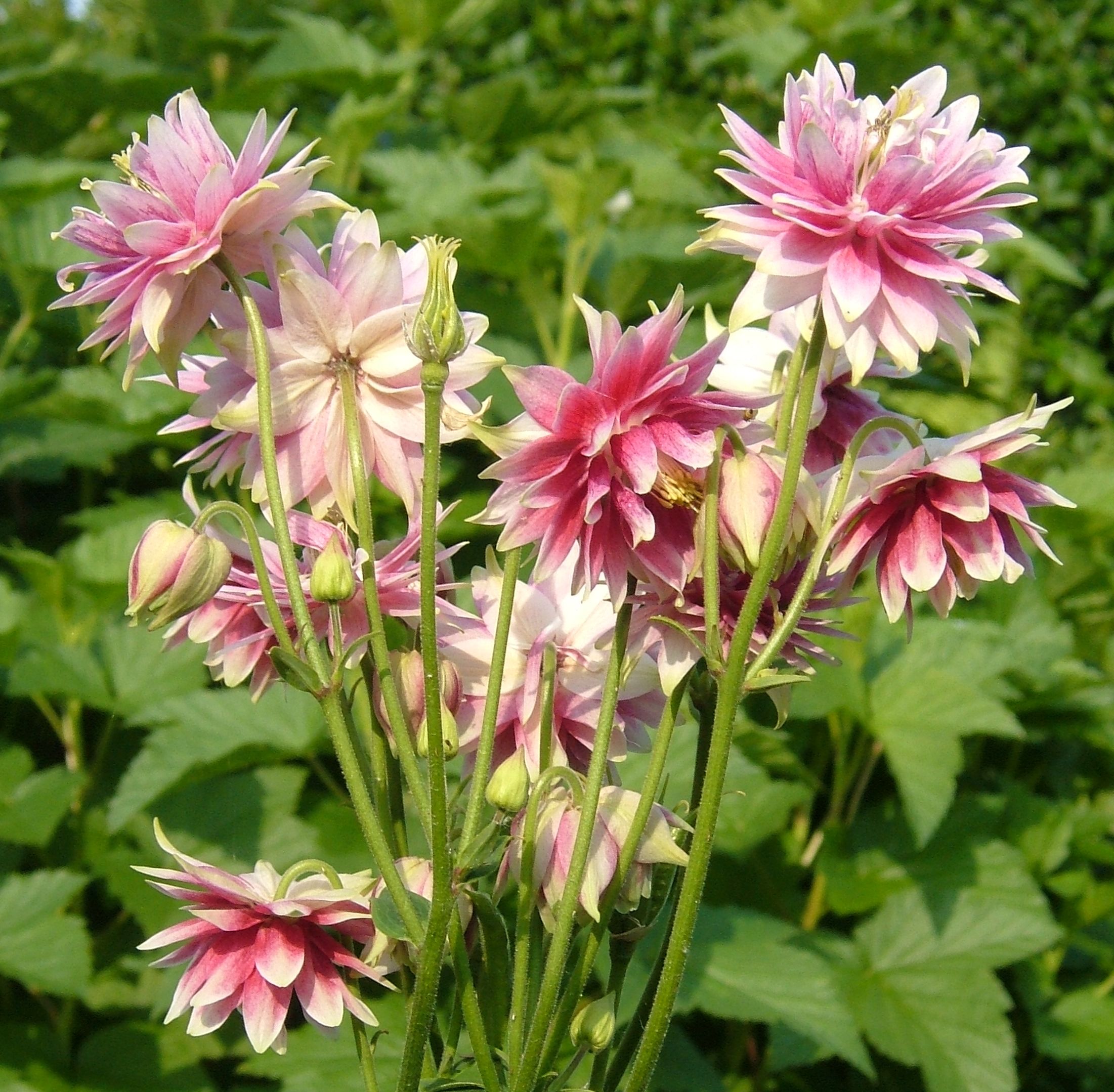
A. vulgaris 'Nora Barlow'

The single-flowering cultivar 'Nivea' (also known as 'Munstead White') received the Royal Horticultural Society's Award of Garden Merit. 'Nivea' plants grow to 90 cm (35 in) tall, have grey-green foliage, and possess white flowers. Other single-flowering cultivars include 'Heidi' and 'Hensol Harebell', both of which can reach can reach 60 cm (24 in) tall and have nodding flowers. 'Heidi' plants have purple-red stems and pink flowers, while 'Hensol Harebell' flowers are short-spurred and mauve-blue.

The double-flowered cultivars of A. vulgaris are divided into groups. Within the Flore Pleno group, which includes the white-flowered 'Graeme Iddon' and mauve-blue-flowered 'Rougham Star', the flowers are elongated and the petals are rounded. The cultivars of the Veraeneana group come in several colours of flower and possess green and gold marbled foliage.

The Stellata group's double flowers are star-shaped and have pointed petals. This group includes the dark purple-flowered 'Black Barlow', the blue-flowered 'Blue Barlow', the multicoloured 'Nora Barlow', and the light-pink flower 'Rose Barlow'. Named for Nora Barlow, who was a British botanist and Charles Darwin's granddaughter, 'Nora Barlow' originated in her Cambridgeshire garden during the early 1980s. Since the introduction of 'Nora Barlow' into cultivation by the horticulturist Alan Bloom, it has become widely sold. Hybridization has altered the cultivar's appearance from nodding flowers that were equally green, white, and pink to forward-facing flowers with little green.

== In culture ==
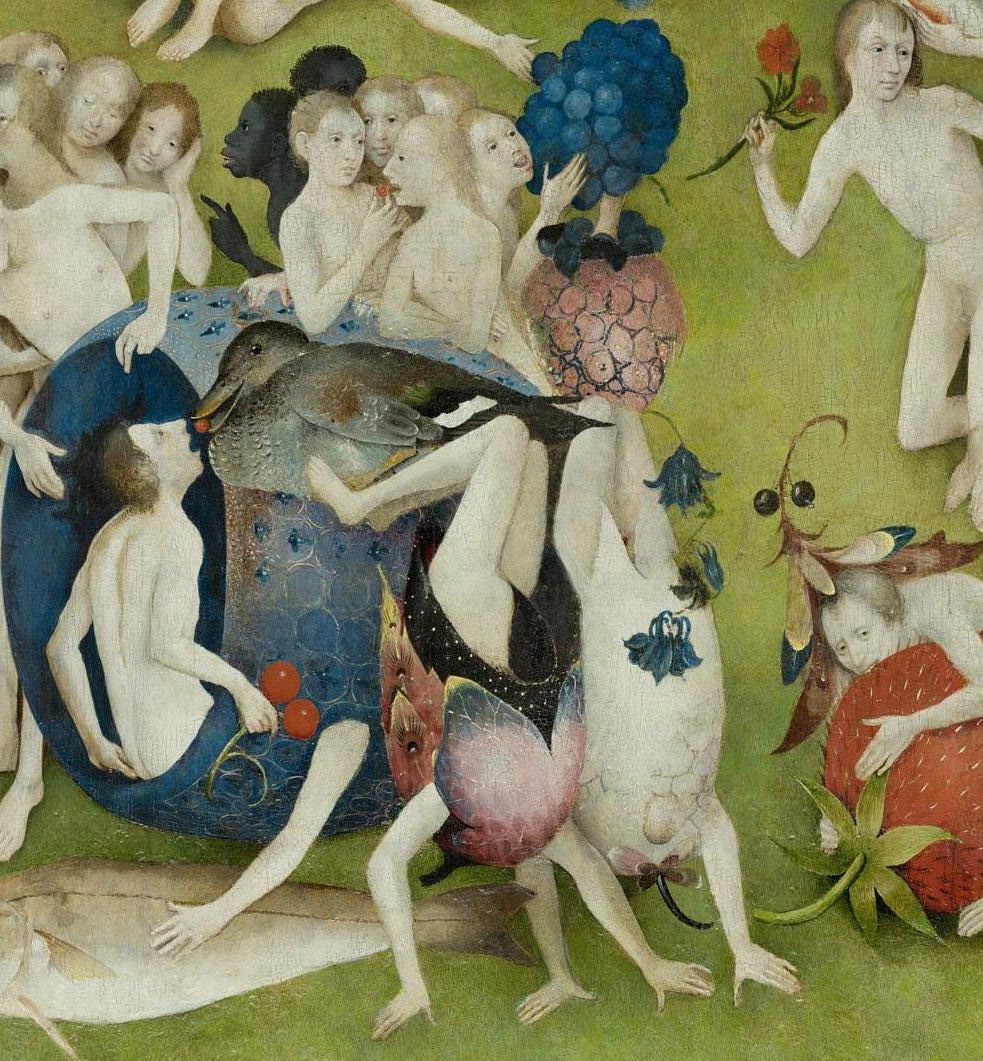
Aquilegia vulgaris served as a symbol of bodily pleasures within Hieronymus Bosch's The Garden of Earthly Delights (detail pictured).

European columbines such as Aquilegia vulgaris have been assigned several meanings since the ancient period. Within art, A. vulgaris has been a symbol of both moral and immoral behaviours, as well as an ornamental motif. In ancient Greece and ancient Rome, the spurs of columbines were interpreted as phallic and the plants were associated with the fertility goddesses Aphrodite and Venus. In William Shakespeare's Elizabethan drama Hamlet, the character Ophelia presents King Claudius with flowers that include A. vulgaris, where the species is symbolic of deception and serves as an omen of death. In The Garden of Earthly Delights (1503–1504) by Hieronymus Bosch, A. vulgaris serves as a symbol for bodily pleasures.

Medieval European artists associated the plant with Christian sacredness and sublimity, with Flemish painters of the 15th century frequently depicting the plant in prominent locations within their Christian artworks. Among the Flemish works of this period featuring A. vulgaris are Rogier van der Weyden's Lamentation of Christ (c. 1450), Hans Memling's The Last Judgment (1470–1472) and Flowers in a Jug (c. 1485), and Hugo van der Goes's Portinari Altarpiece (1475–1476). Combined with dianthus flowers, it symbolizes a pure marriage as in Portrait of a Princess by the Late-Gothic painter Pisanello.

With its dove-like flowers, the species came to symbolize the Holy Spirit, such as in a 1497 Parisian book of hours by German printer Thielman Kerver. The interpretation of the five spurs as five doves led columbines to be called "Five birds together" in Austria. A set of seven columbine flowers was associated with the Seven gifts of the Holy Spirit. The numeric symbolism of columbines was extended to its leaves, with their three-lobed form drawing associations with the Trinity.
