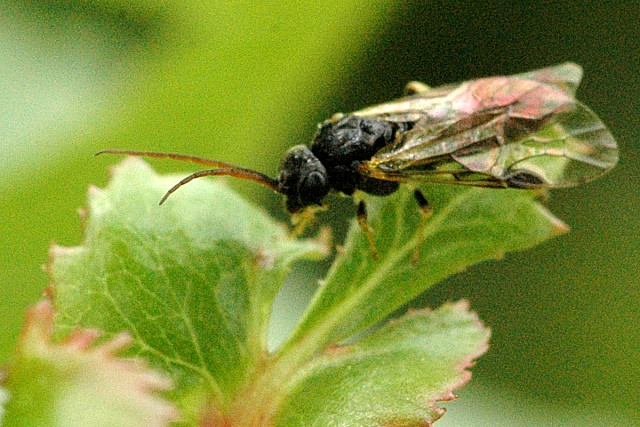
- Adult mountain ash sawfly, Pristiphora geniculata (Hartig)

Scientific classification
- Kingdom: Animalia
- Phylum: Arthropoda
- Clade: Pancrustacea
- Class: Insecta
- Order: Hymenoptera
- Suborder: Symphyta
- Family: Tenthredinidae
- Tribe: Nematini
- Genus: Pristiphora; Latreille, 1810

Type species
- Pteronus testaceus Jurine, 1807

Diversity
- at least 130 species

= Pristiphora =

Genus of sawflies

Pristiphora is a genus of sawfly in the family Tenthredinidae. Some of its species, such as the larch sawfly Pristiphora erichsonii, eat the leaves of economically valuable trees and shrubs, and can be serious pests.

== See also ==
- List of Pristiphora species
