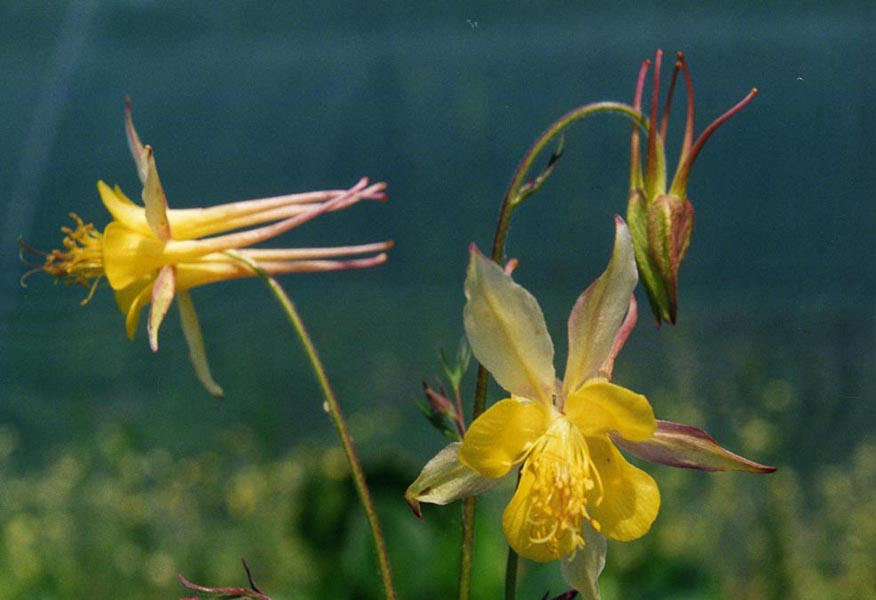
- Aquilegia chapelinei (Chaplin's columbine) flowers

Conservation status
- Imperiled (NatureServe)

Scientific classification
- Kingdom: Plantae
- Clade: Tracheophytes
- Clade: Angiosperms
- Clade: Eudicots
- Order: Ranunculales
- Family: Ranunculaceae
- Genus: Aquilegia
- Species: A. chaplinei

Binomial name
- Aquilegia chaplinei Standl. ex Payson
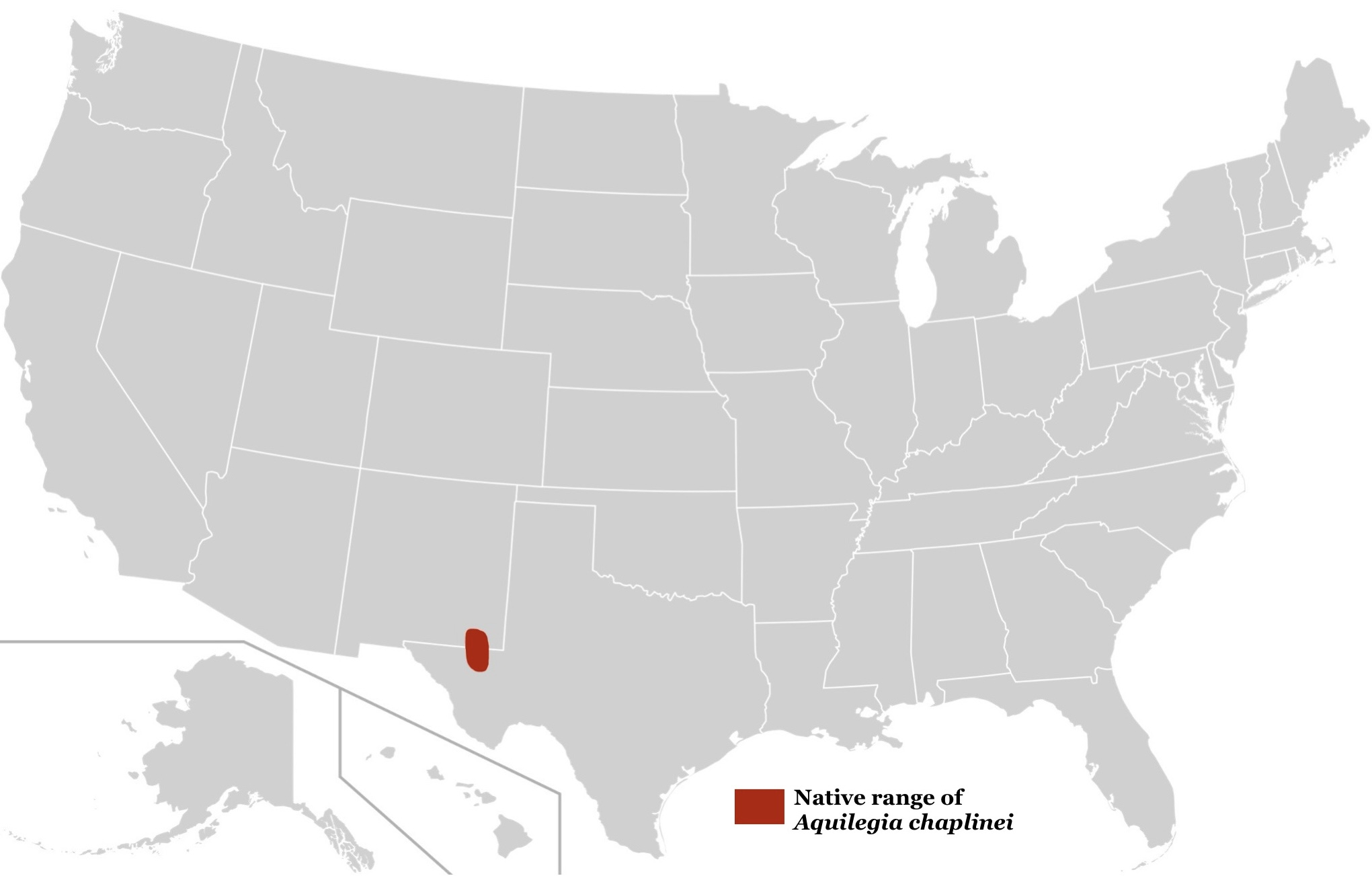
- Native range (in red) in the US

Synonyms
- Aquilegia chrysantha var. chaplinei (Standl. ex Payson) Lott

= Aquilegia chaplinei =

Species of flowering plant

Aquilegia chaplinei, also known as Chaplin's columbine, (Note: Other names for the flower include Chaplin's yellow columbine, Chaplin's golden columbine, Chapline columbine, and Guadalupe Mountain columbine.) is a species of flowering plant in the family Ranunculaceae native to the arid Guadalupe and Sacramento Mountains of West Texas and southeastern New Mexico in the West South Central United States. A perennial plant with an average height of 40 centimeters (16 in), A. chaplinei is characterized as a dwarf version of its close relative Aquilegia chrysantha and is sometimes considered a variant of this species under the name Aquilegia chrysantha var. chaplinei.

A. chaplinei's leaves are in a basal arrangement (sprouting from base of the shoot) and give the plant a fern-like appearance when not flowering. Its flowers are pale yellow. It is named for William Ridgley Chapline, the first person to collect the plant and who collected the holotype from Sitting Bull Falls in New Mexico in 1916.

The plant has been the subject of conservation protections, including a New Mexican law prohibiting the collection of seeds from wild examples. In 2017, a consortium of state and federal agencies determined the species was "effectively conserved".

== Description ==
Aquilegia chaplinei is a perennial plant with a height from 20 centimeters (7.9 in) to 50 centimeters (20 in), averaging 40 centimeters (16 in) tall. This is somewhat shorter than the closely related Aquilegia chrysantha, which can reach up to 120 centimeters (47 in) tall. A. chaplinei's type locality at an altitude of 1,650 meters (5,410 ft) suggests that it is better adapted than A. chrysantha to arid environments. A. chaplinei has a slender stem that is glabrous (smooth) with the exception of the inflorescence.

Possessing leaves in a basal arrangement (sprouting from base of the shoot), A. chaplinei has leaves which extend on slender petioles that are 7 centimeters (2.8 in) to 10 centimeters (3.9 in) long. The leaves themselves range from bi- to barely triternately compound. A. chaplinei has a fern-like appearance when not flowering. The leaves are semi-evergreen.

It has pale yellow flowers. Its spurs range from 30 millimeters (1.2 in) to 40 millimeters (1.6 in) and can be slender, straight, or slightly spreading. The short spurs and sepals under 2 centimeters long – between 13 millimeters (0.51 in) and 16 millimeters (0.63 in) – are the primary distinguishing features that separate A. chaplinei from A. chrysantha. A. chaplinei has yellow sepals. The flowers bloom between April and November, with greatest reliability in June and July.

Breeding is performed through its unisexual flowers, meaning that individual flowers exclusively possess either stamen or carpels, making it monoecious. Its seeds are nearly 2 millimeters (0.079 in) long.

== Taxonomy ==
Aquilegia chaplinei is within the Aquilegia (columbine) genus. The plant, including its holotype, was first collected by William Ridgely Chapline from Sitting Bull Falls in Eddy County, New Mexico, on May 25, 1916. Chapline was a rangeland management scientist who was employed by the United States Department of Agriculture and later served as the chief of forest conservation within the United Nations' Food and Agriculture Organization.

The plant was first formally described by the binomial Aquilegia chaplinei in 1918 within Edwin Blake Payson's "The North American Species of Aquilegia", published in Contributions from the United States National Herbarium. Payson credited Paul Carpenter Standley with the initial description. (Note: Due to Payson's crediting of Standley, the author citation is rendered as "Standl. ex Payson".) The holotype is now in the collection of the National Museum of Natural History.

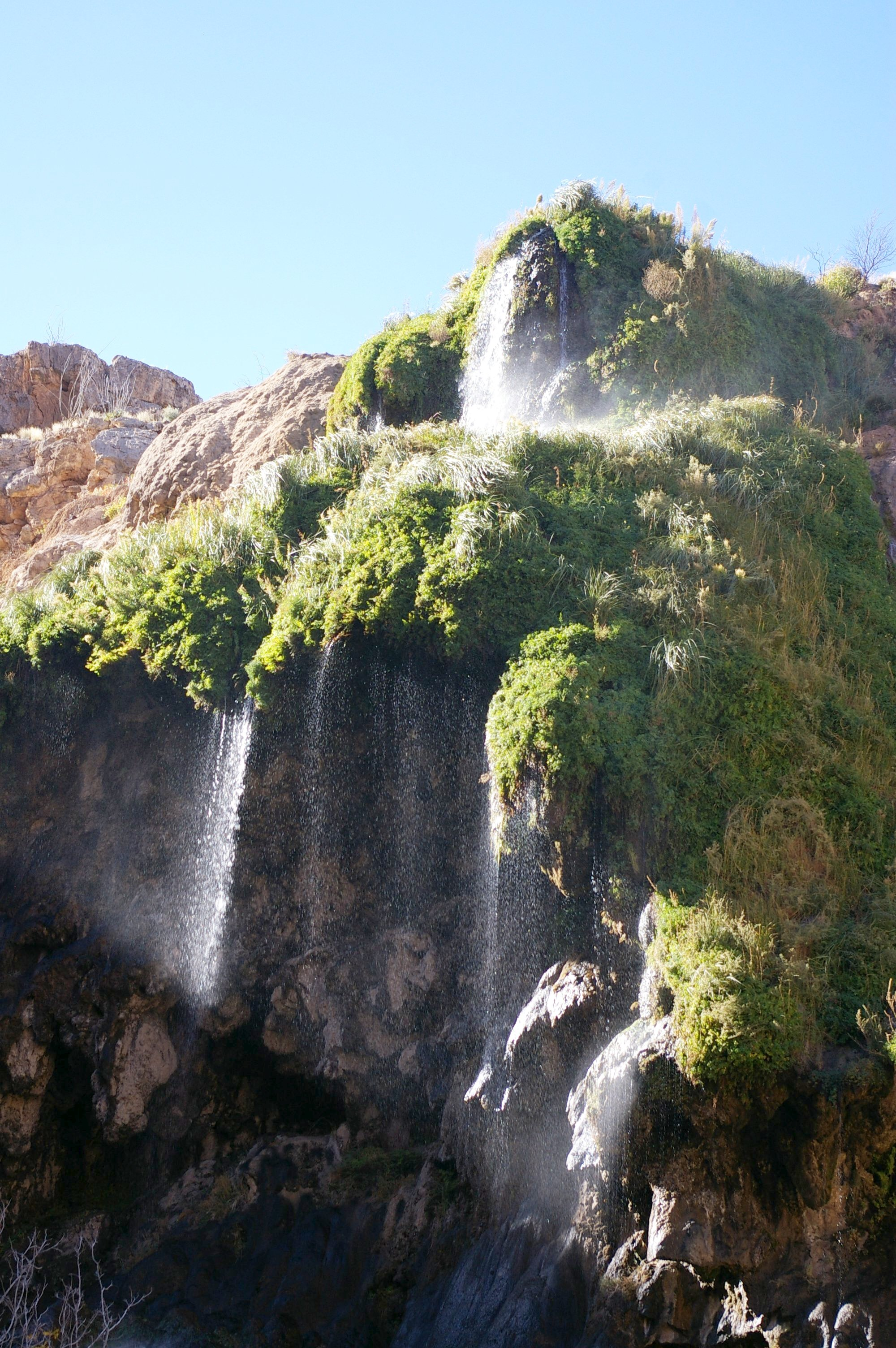
The holotype of Aquilegia chaplinei (left) was collected by W. R. Chapline from Sitting Bull Falls (right) in May 1916.

In 1985, Emily J. Lott proposed reclassifying the plant as Aquilegia chrysantha var. chaplinei in the journal Phytologia. (Note: Simultaneously, Lott also proposed reclassifying Aquilegia hinckleyana as another variant of A. chrysantha. The author citation for Aquilegia chrysantha var. chaplinei is rendered as "(Standl. ex Payson) Lott".) Lott's proposal came out of her study of plants in the Chihuahuan Desert, stemming from her 1979 unpublished master's thesis on Aquilegia in the Trans-Pecos region of Texas. The renaming as a variant of A. chrysantha proposed by Lott was not broadly accepted outside of Texas but remains in use within that state. The Lady Bird Johnson Wildflower Center of the University of Texas at Austin utilizes the name proposed by Lott for the plant, while the Texas Parks and Wildlife Department (TPWD) uses A. chaplinei.

=== Names ===
The word columbine derives from the Latin word columbinus, meaning "dove", a reference to the flowers' appearance of a group of doves. The genus name Aquilegia may come from the Latin word for "eagle", aquila, in reference to the petals' resemblance to eagle talons. Aquilegia may also derive from aquam legere, which is Latin for "to collect water", or aquilegium, a Latin word for a container of water.

The species is named for Chapline. Common names for the species include Chaplin's columbine, Chaplin's yellow columbine, Chaplin's golden columbine, Chapline columbine, and Guadalupe Mountain columbine.

== Distribution ==
The species is endemic to the Guadalupe Mountains of West Texas and southeastern New Mexico in the West South Central United States. (Note: The TPWD does not consider the species endemic.) It is also native to the New Mexican Sacramento Mountains, though this population of yellow columbines is distinct from others in the region In 1984, the Sacramento Mountains population was described as "somewhat intermediary between A. chaplinei and A. chrysantha" by the New Mexico Native Plant Advisory Committee. The New Mexican range of A. chaplinei extends across the counties of Eddy and Otero.

The Guadalupe Mountains are an extremely arid environment, and A. chaplinei is found where the ground is moist such as along streams, canyons, and at the base of rocks. The TPWD identifies the species's preferred habitats as "[p]erennially moist to wet limestone canyon walls; moist leaf litter and humus among boulders in wooded mesic canyons".

The species can be found in Lincoln National Forest in south-central New Mexico. Within the Guadalupe District, the southernmost division of the national forest, A. chaplinei congregates in seeps at the bottom of limestone cliffs. In McKittrick Canyon, the species blooms between early spring and mid-fall, with particular lushness in September.

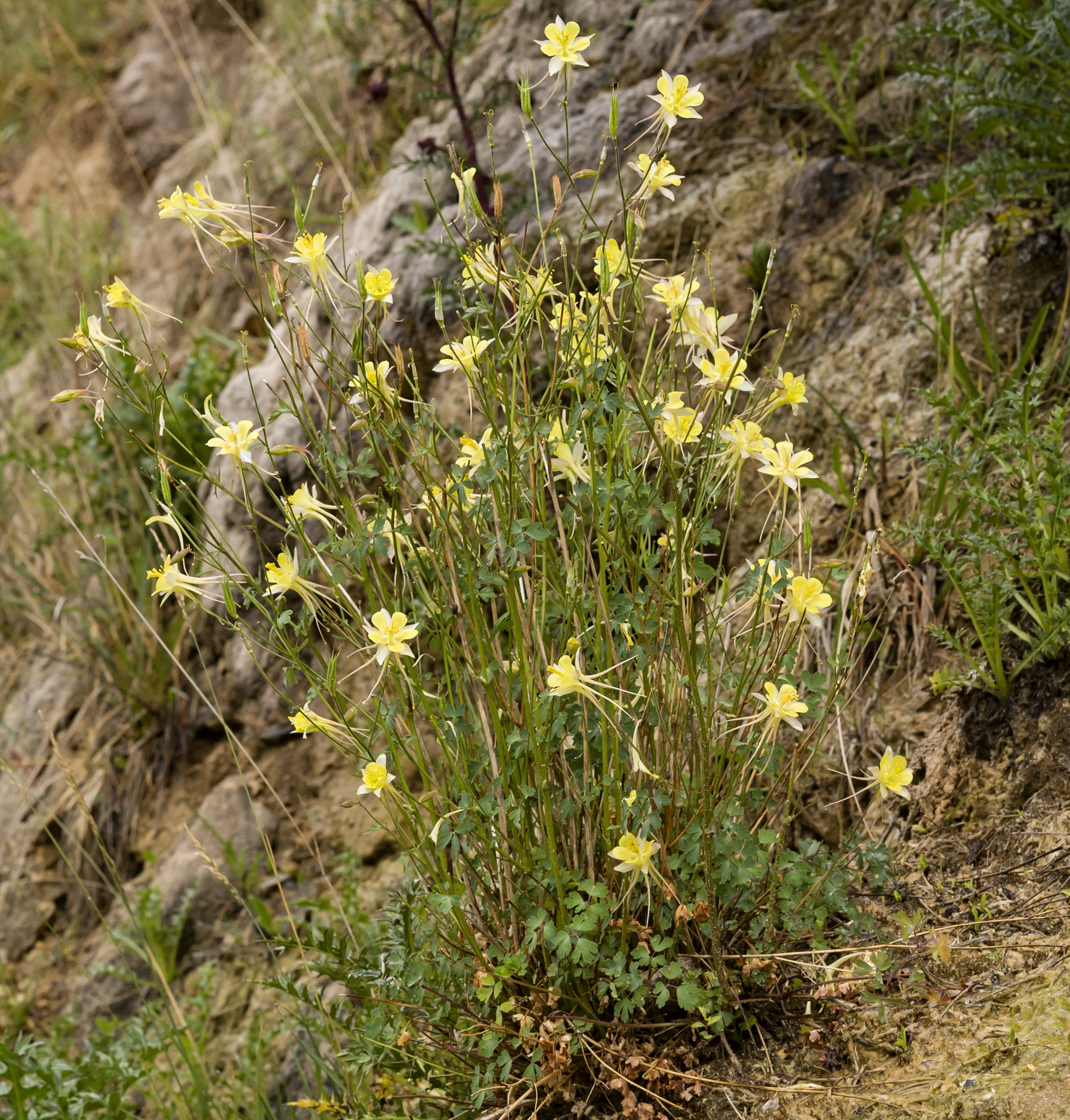
An Aquilegia chaplinei plant in the wild

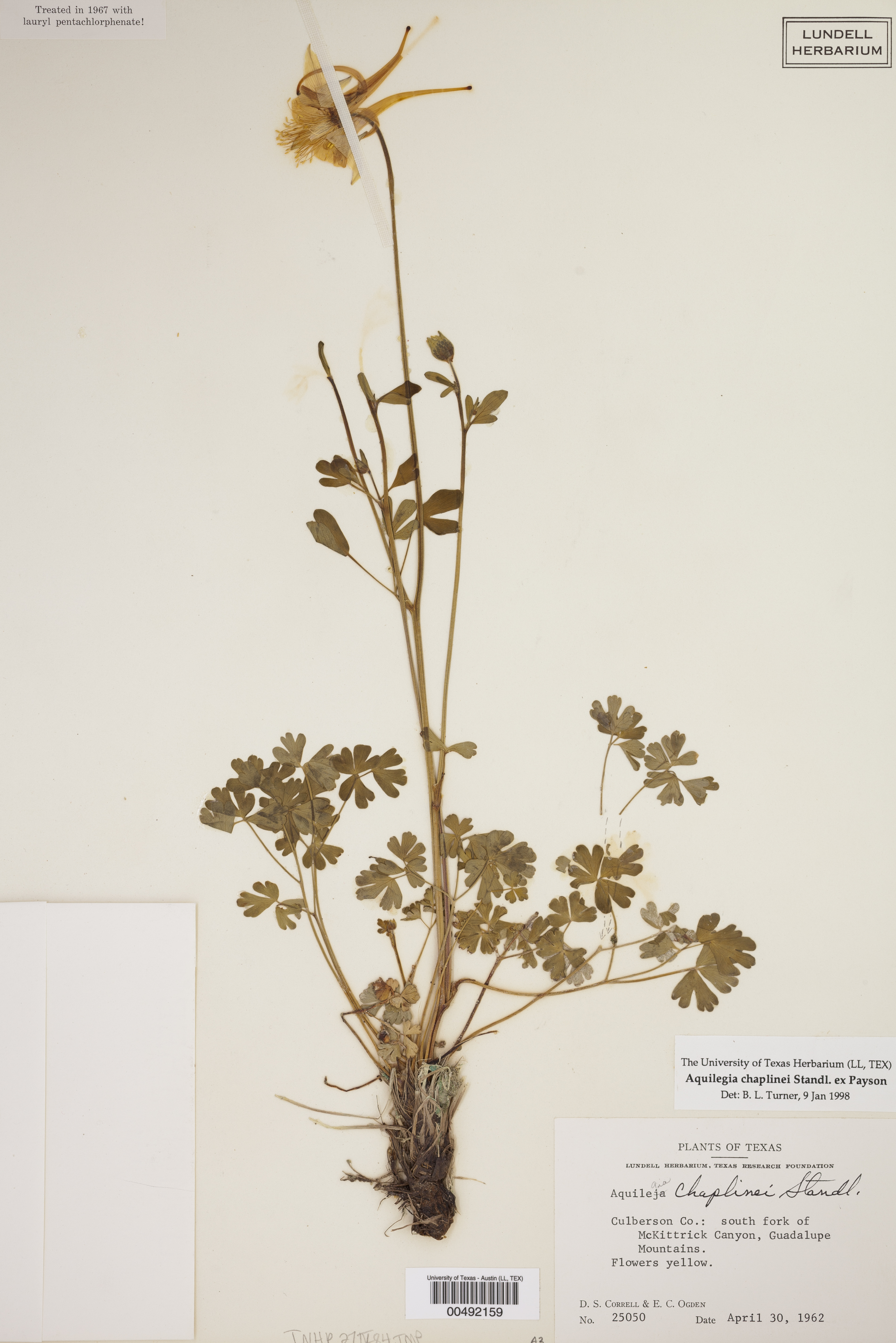
A preserved specimen from the Guadalupe Mountains

== Conservation ==
A. chaplinei is considered a rare plant within its natural range. The Flora of North America lists the species as of conservation concern. The University of New Mexico's Rare New Mexico Plants provides an assessment that A. chaplinei is "effectively conserved" and identifies human water management as a threat to the species. The plant's NatureServe conservation status is S2 in both New Mexico and Texas and G2, meaning both the individual state and global populations of the species are considered "imperiled".

The Bureau of Land Management categorizes the plant as a "sensitive" species. As of 1998, A. chaplinei was conserved under the New Mexico Endangered Plant Species Act, legally prohibiting unauthorized seed collection. By 2017, the plant was deemed "effectively conserved" by the New Mexico Rare Plant Conservation Strategy, a consortium of the New Mexico Energy, Minerals and Natural Resources Department, Bureau of Land Management, and United States Forest Service. The plant does not have a listed conservation status from the federal or Texas governments but was included in the TPWD's "Species of Greatest Conservation Need" as of 2024.

== Cultivation ==
In 1946, American botanist Philip A. Munz wrote that he was unaware of A. chaplinei being available for sale. As of 2003, both seeds and plants were sometimes available, particularly from native plant nurseries in the region of A. chaplinei's native range.

The Lady Bird Johnson Wildflower Center identified fully shaded or partially shaded locations as good locations for planting to prevent stressing the plant and curling in the leaves. A. chaplinei requires both moisture and drainage. In particularly hot and arid settings, the plant becomes susceptible to aphids and spider mites. Aquilegia species hybridize easily, so spacing between different species and varieties is necessary to prevent cross pollination. Plants reach maturity in between two and five years.

== Uses ==
The Apache people considered the plant medicinal. Apaches utilized boiled roots as a remedy for bruises. In order to tone their bodies, they made a tea with the plant. The medicinal qualities of the plant's seed were considered especially significant and were further believed to be an aphrodisiac. Ingestion of the plant may result in stomach irritation.
