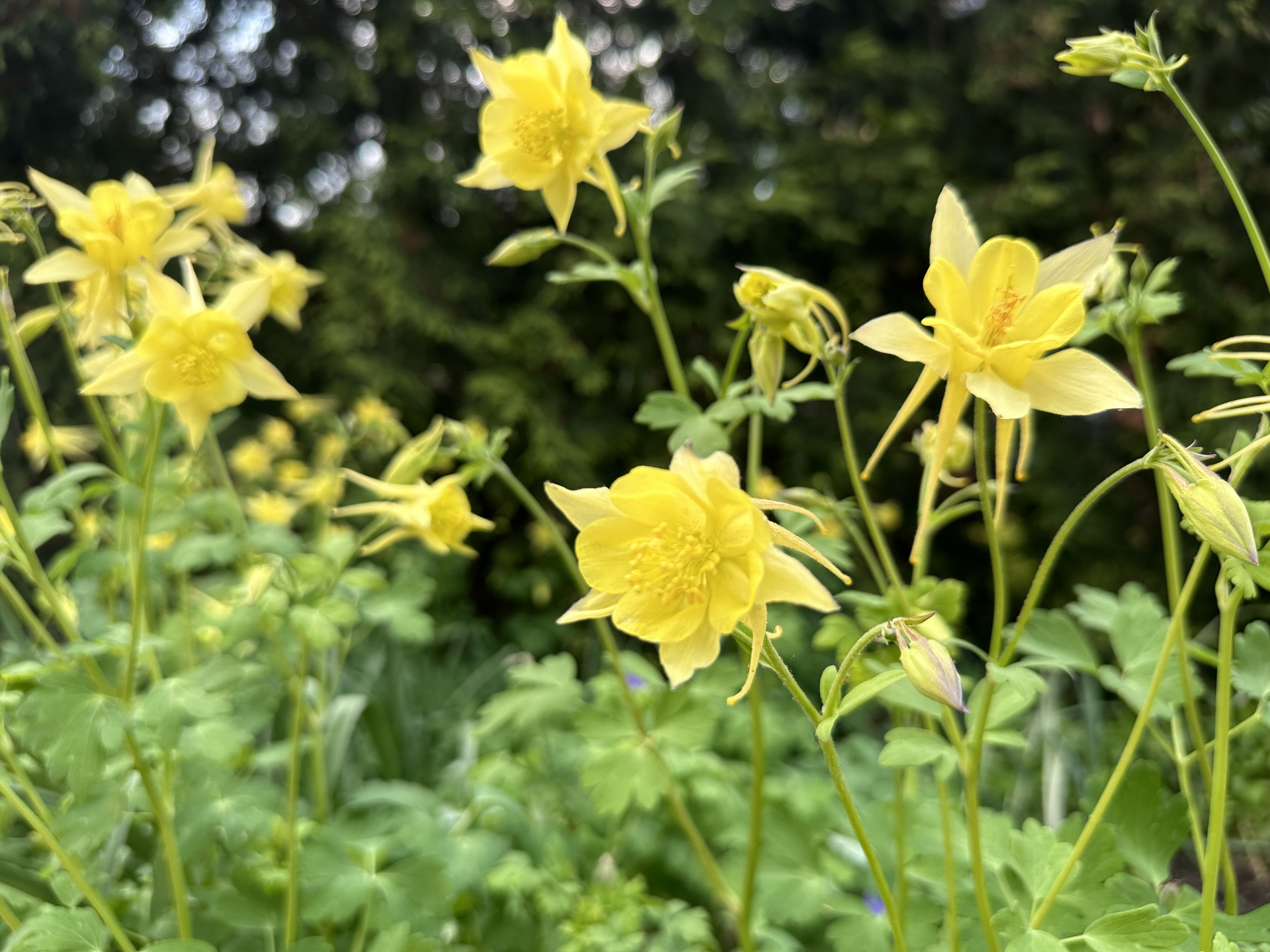

Conservation status
- Critically Imperiled (NatureServe)

Scientific classification
- Kingdom: Plantae
- Clade: Tracheophytes
- Clade: Angiosperms
- Clade: Eudicots
- Order: Ranunculales
- Family: Ranunculaceae
- Genus: Aquilegia
- Species: A. hinckleyana

Binomial name
- Aquilegia hinckleyana Munz
- Location of Capote Falls in Texas, only location where A. hinckleyana is found in the wild

Synonyms
- Aquilegia chrysantha var. hinckleyana (Munz) Lott 1985

= Aquilegia hinckleyana =

Species of flowering plant

Aquilegia hinckleyana, or Hinckley's golden columbine, is a partially recognized species of flowering plant of the genus Aquilegia (columbines) in the family Ranunculaceae endemic to Capote Falls in northwestern Presidio County, Texas. The plant is found within a small region of the county and only grows in moister areas of its generally dry range. Considered a smaller version of Aquilegia chrysantha, A. hinckleyana has a height of around 60 centimetres (24 in) and possesses yellow flowers. It has seen modern cultivation, particularly in Texas. The species is named for L. C. Hinckley, who first collected the species in 1943.

In 1985, it was proposed that the species should be reevaluated as a variety of A. chrysantha. The name A. chrysantha var. hinckley has been adopted by Lady Bird Johnson Wildflower Center and some commercial distributors. The Royal Botanic Gardens, Kew and the Flora of North America agree with Philip A. Munz's original 1946 classification of the plant as a separate species.

== Description ==
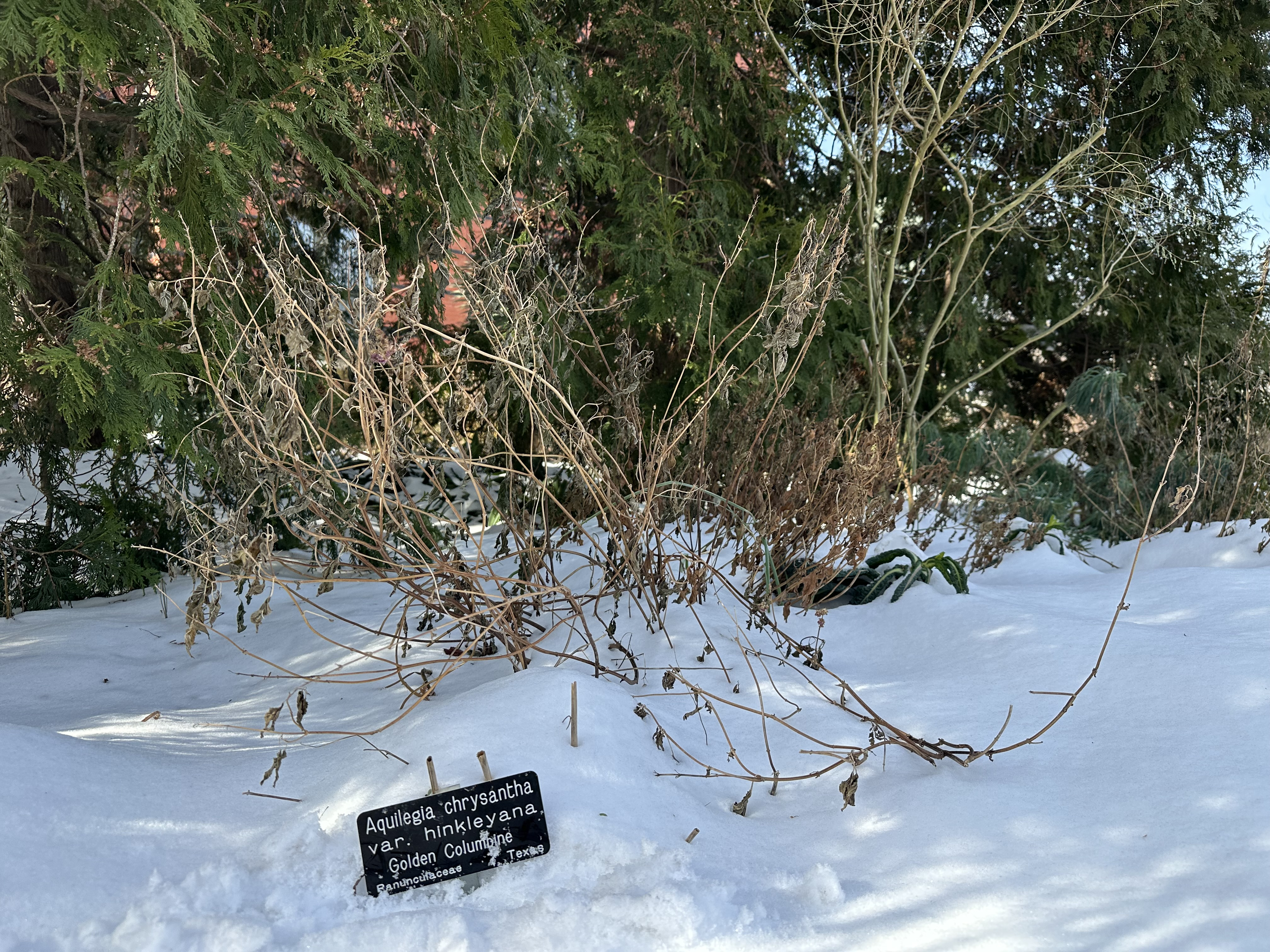
An Aquilegia hinkleyana (labeled under its alternative scientific name Aquilegia chrysantha var. hinckleyana) plant in winter. Its seed pods have been removed.

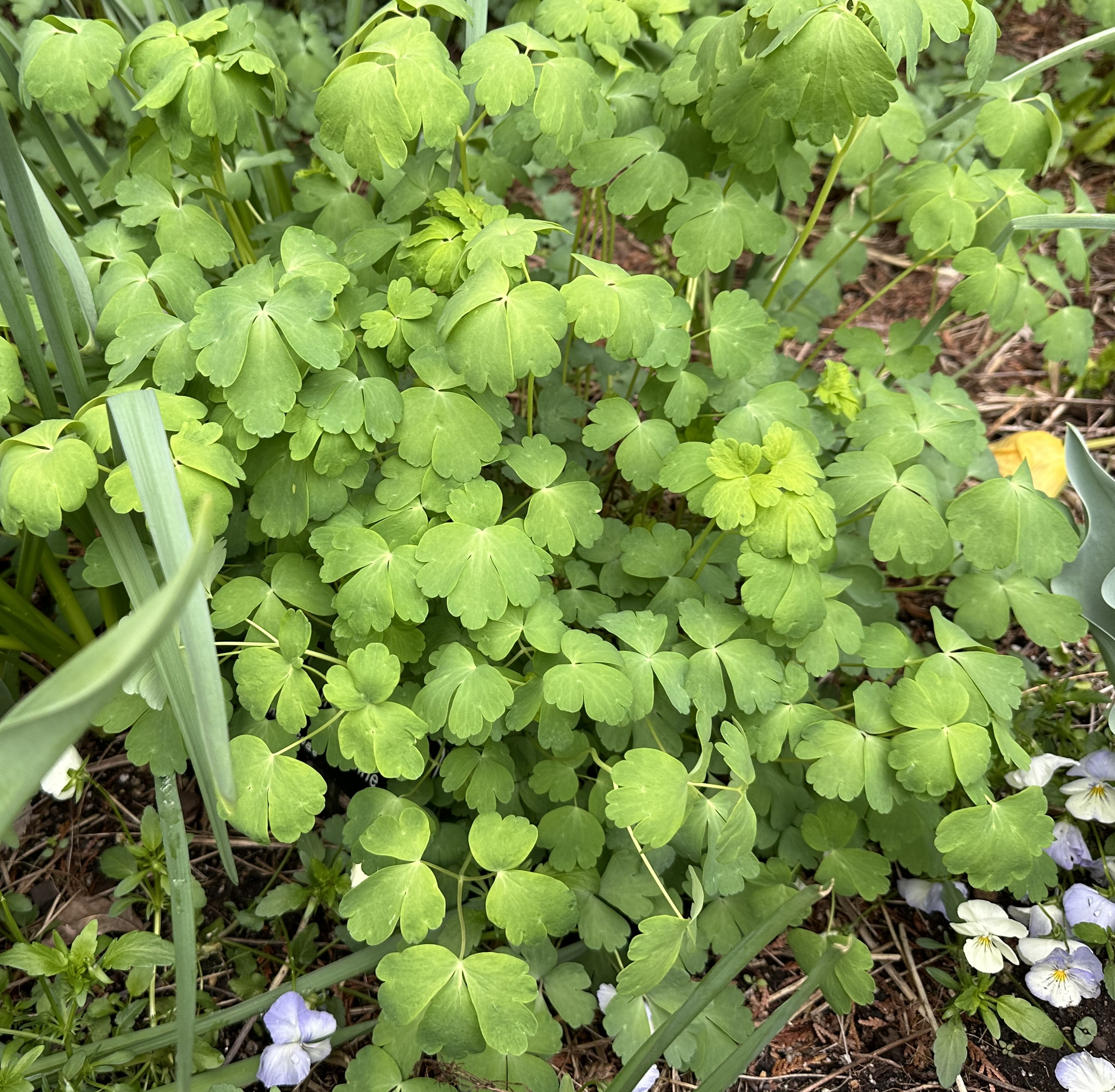
Aquilegia hinckleyana pre-bloom

Aquilegia hinckleyana is, like other members of the Aquilegia, a short-lived perennial. The species has a height of around 60 centimetres (24 in), with stems ranging between 50 centimetres (20 in) and 70 centimetres (28 in) tall. The stems have a width of between 4 millimetres (0.16 in) and 7 millimetres (0.28 in) at the base. These stems are glabrous and glaucous below the base.

The basal leaves (the leaves attached to the base of the plant) are biternately compound (leaves with petioles that divide into two or and each bear three leaflets). The overall lengths of the leaves, including their petioles and leaflets, range between 20 cm (7.9 in) and 40 cm (16 in) long and are shorter than the stems of a given individual.

The plant has yellow flowers. The flowers stand suberect with spreading sepals that are roughly 25 millimetres (0.98 in) long and 17 millimetres (0.67 in) wide. It has slender nectar spurs that are about 4 centimetres (1.6 in) and 5 millimetres (0.20 in) wide. The plant propagates through seeds dropping to replace mother plants.

=== Ecology ===
Aquilegia hinckleyana is sphingophilous (pollinated by moths). A process of co-adaptation led to increased interspecific divergence between western North American Aquilegia pollinated by hummingbirds and those pollinated by hawkmoths. Among the adaptations to encourage hawkmoth pollination are white or pale flowers and nocturnal nectar production. In this respect, A. hinckleyana is part of the Aquilegia coerulea species complex. A. hinckleyana can also host the larva of the columbine duskywing, Erynnis lucilius.

== Taxonomy ==
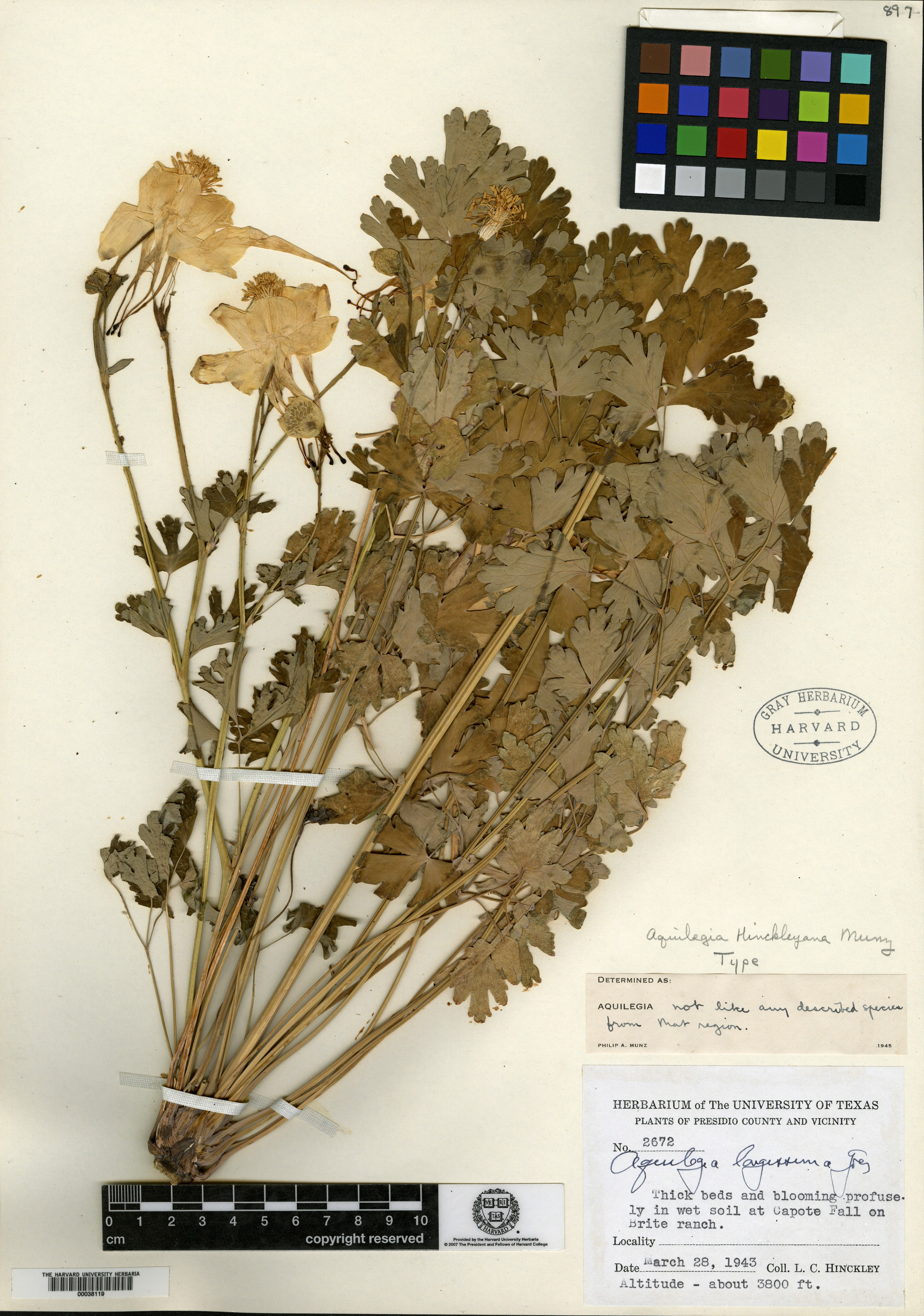
Holotype of Aquilegia hinckleyana

The holotype for A. hinckleyana was collected by Marfa, Texas, resident L. C. Hinckley on March 28, 1943, from Capote Falls and first described with its binomial nomenclature by botanist Philip A. Munz in 1946. The holotype, L. C. Hinckley 2672, is in the Harvard University Herbaria, with a paratype inventoried at Cornell University's Bailey Hortorium. The plant is recognized as a species under Munz's classification by Royal Botanic Gardens, Kew and Flora of North America.

In 1985, Emily J. Lott proposed reevaluating A. hinckleyana and Aquilegia chaplinei as a varieties of A chrysantha, with A. hinckleyana renamed as ''A. chyrsantha var. hinckleyana. Lott's reclassification of both plants has been adopted by the Lady Bird Johnson Wildflower Center at the University of Texas at Austin. Some commercial distributors have also referred to the plant using this classification.

=== Etymology ===
The word columbine derives from the Latin word columbinus, meaning "dove", a reference to the flowers' appearance of a group of doves. The genus name Aquilegia may come from the Latin word for "eagle", aquila, in reference to the pedals' resemblance to eagle talons. Aquilegia may also derive from aquam legere, which is Latin for "to collect water", or aquilegium, a Latin word for a container of water. Munz named the species for Hinckley, saying that it was "a pleasure to dedicate it to its discoverer".

== Distribution ==
Aquilegia hinckleyana is endemic to a small area around Capote Falls in the Sierra Vieja mountains of northwestern Presidio County, Texas, the site of its type locality. The falls is privately held as part of the Brite Ranch. Hinckley reported that the plant formed "a thick bed on the always moist bank under the overhanging cliff at the fall".

== Conservation ==
The plant's NatureServe conservation status was last evaluated in 1997, when it was rated at T1 to indicate it as a critically imperiled variety of A. chrysantha. The Nature Conservancy identified pollution, overgrazing, and diversion of water as the primary threats to the plant and recommended the protection of 100 acres around the plant's range to encompass portions upstream.

== Use ==
Aquilegia hinckleyana is poisonous towards humans and animals. In the region near the present-day Four Corners, the Paiute peoples historically used the plant's seeds and roots. Seeds were used to perfume and were kept on clothing in sachets to their clothing and chewed so that they could be applied on clothing and skin. The roots were processed to treat coughs and rheumatism.

== Cultivation ==
Despite its rarity in the wild, Aquilegia hinckleyana is a popular spring-blooming flower in Texas. Botanist Robert Nold noted its prevalence in nurseries, particularly in Texas, in 2003. The plant remains commercially available. Like other Aquilegia species, A. hinckleyana's ability to tolerate shade is valued in cultivation. It also shares its genus's inclination towards hybridization, meaning columbines sold as "yellow columbine" or "golden columbine" are often derived from multiple species.

The 'Texas Gold' cultivar has golden-yellow flowers that are appreciated for their long spurs. The plant favors well-drained soils that are high levels of organic matter. The cultivar can be grown in clay provided that it is in an elevated bed that prevents the roots from being in pooled water. When grown next to a deciduous tree, the plant is sufficiently shaded in the summer while exposed to enough sunlight during the winter. Propagation of 'Texas Gold' can be performed by division. The species is resistant to deer and rabbits while attracting bees, butterflies, and hummingbirds. Removing flowers that have completed their bloom can encourage re-flowering but retaining flowers will enable self-seeding.
