= Capote Falls =

Highest waterfall in Texas, US

Coordinates: 30°12′51″N 104°33′37″W

Capote Falls is a waterfall on Capote Creek in the Sierra Vieja mountains in northwestern Presidio County, Texas, United States. At up to 175 feet (53 m) tall, it is the highest waterfall in Texas. Serving as a moist oasis in an otherwise barren area, the site is the only location where the columbine species Aquilegia hinckleyana (Hinckley's columbine) is found in the wild. The waterfall has seen significant damage by erosion since 1964. Located on the privately owned Brite Ranch, access is restricted to those with permission from the property owners.

== Description ==
Capote Falls is a waterfall formed by Capote Creek flowing off the volcanic rim of the Sierra Vieja mountains in northwestern Presidio County, Texas, about 70 miles (110 km) northwest of Presidio and about 35 miles (56 km) west of Marfa. The water flows from Capote Springs, which was measured in July 1976 as flowing from the springs at a rate of 2 gallons per second. With water falling up to 175 feet (53 m) from the top of the falls to the shallow basin below, it is the highest waterfall in Texas. Heights of 150 feet (46 m) and an estimated 170 feet (52 m) have also been given for the waterfall, but Capote Falls would still be the highest waterfall in Texas at 150 feet tall. The falls is bounded by box canyons on three sides.

The waterfall is possibly named for a slope of travertine deposit behind the lower cascade that has a cape-like appearance. Another possibility is that the name of Capote Creek follows from Capote Peak, which is near its source. Rhyolite and tuff comprise most the of local geology, alongside areas of sand and clay loams occasionally interrupted by stony patches.

The waterfall is located on the privately owned Brite Ranch, also of Brite Ranch raid fame. Access is restricted to those with permission from the property owners, with helicopter flyovers an option for those interested in viewing the falls.

== History ==
For centuries, Capote Falls was only a few miles from the route of several expeditions and under 100 miles (160 km) from the Spanish settlement of La Junta de los Ríos, what is now Presidio, Texas, and Ojinaga, Chihuahua. However, European records show that only one explorer viewed the falls before the 19th century: Antonio de Espejo passed Capote Falls in August 1583 during his expedition to the Rio Grande. It was not impacted by human activity until Lucas Charles Brite's acquisition of the land for a cattle ranch in 1885.

Erosion since 1964 has resulted in what was once a deep basin at the base of the falls to become filled to the point of becoming shallow.

== Flora ==
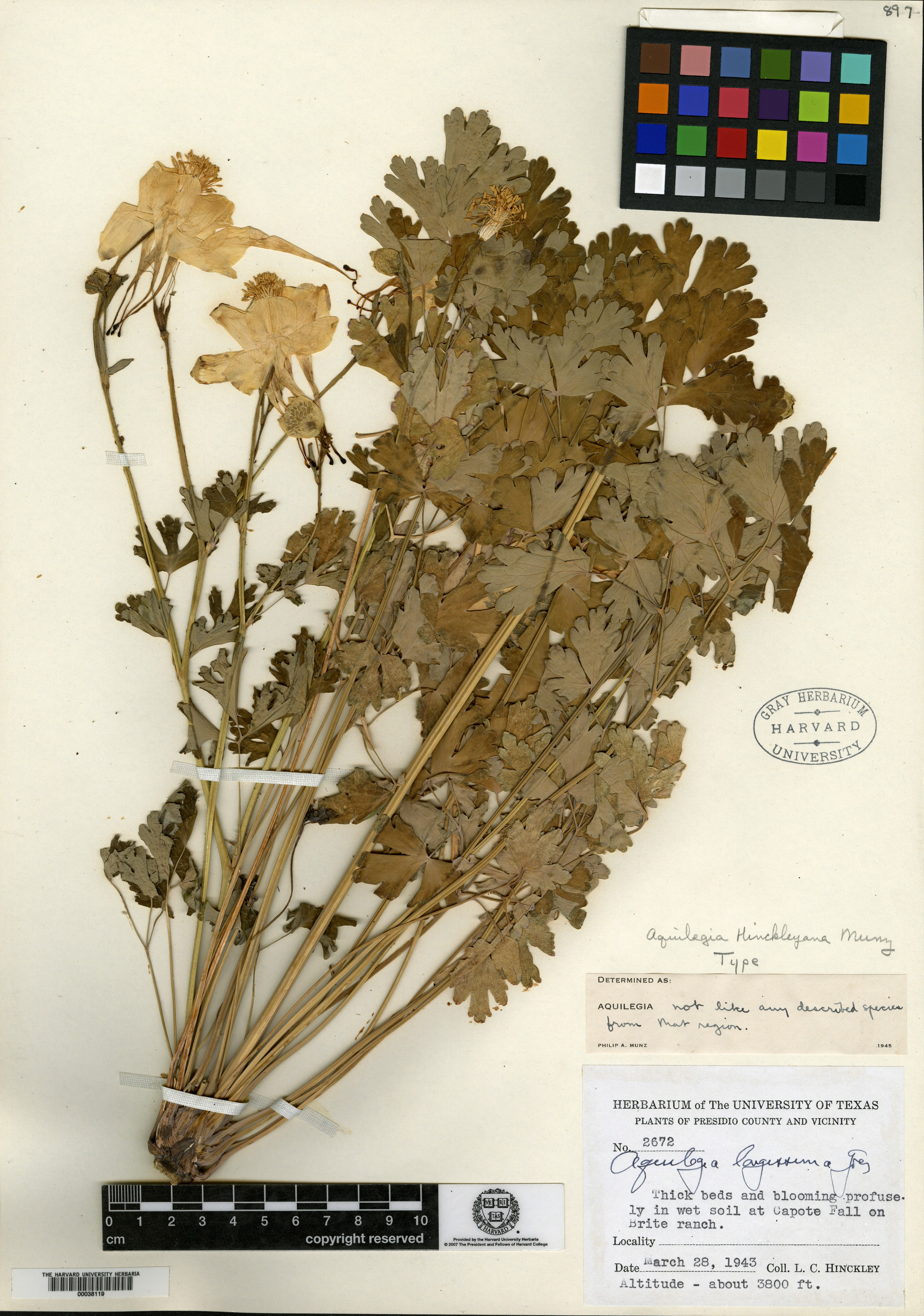
Holotype of Aquilegia hinckleyana, found at

As of 1974, Griffin Smith Jr. of Texas Monthly reported that Capote Falls was host to "nine rare, endangered, or endemic species of plants". Aquilegia hinckleyana (Hinckley's columbine) is a species of columbine that is endemic to a small area around Capote Falls, the site of its type locality. While the surrounding region might suggest the species is drought-resistant, the plant only survives in the moist bank at the base of the falls and nowhere else in the area. The holotype was collected by Marfa resident L. C. Hinckley in 1943 and described by botanist Philip A. Munz in 1946, who named it for Hinckley.

Maidenhair fern is found alongside the columbines, the latter of which Munz reported Hinckley as observing to form "a thick bed on the always moist bank under the overhanging cliff at the fall". Foxtail, ferns, and cottonwoods also survive around the falls. By 1974, erosion on the canyon's edges had exposed the roots of mesquite. Sparse shrubbery is the norm for the area surrounding the falls.

== Fauna ==
Smith reported that there were 76 species of bird that inhabited the canyon around falls, including canyon wrens and black vultures, the latter of which are rare in much of Texas. Smith also said that 29 species of mammals were present around the creek. These included a rare colony of mastiff bats, as well as mountain lions, bobcats, mule deer, badgers, and porcupines. A species of all-female whiptail lizards was also present.

Hinckley's columbine serves as a host to the larva of the columbine duskywing, Erynnis lucilius.
