= Sierra Vieja =

Mountain range in Texas, United States

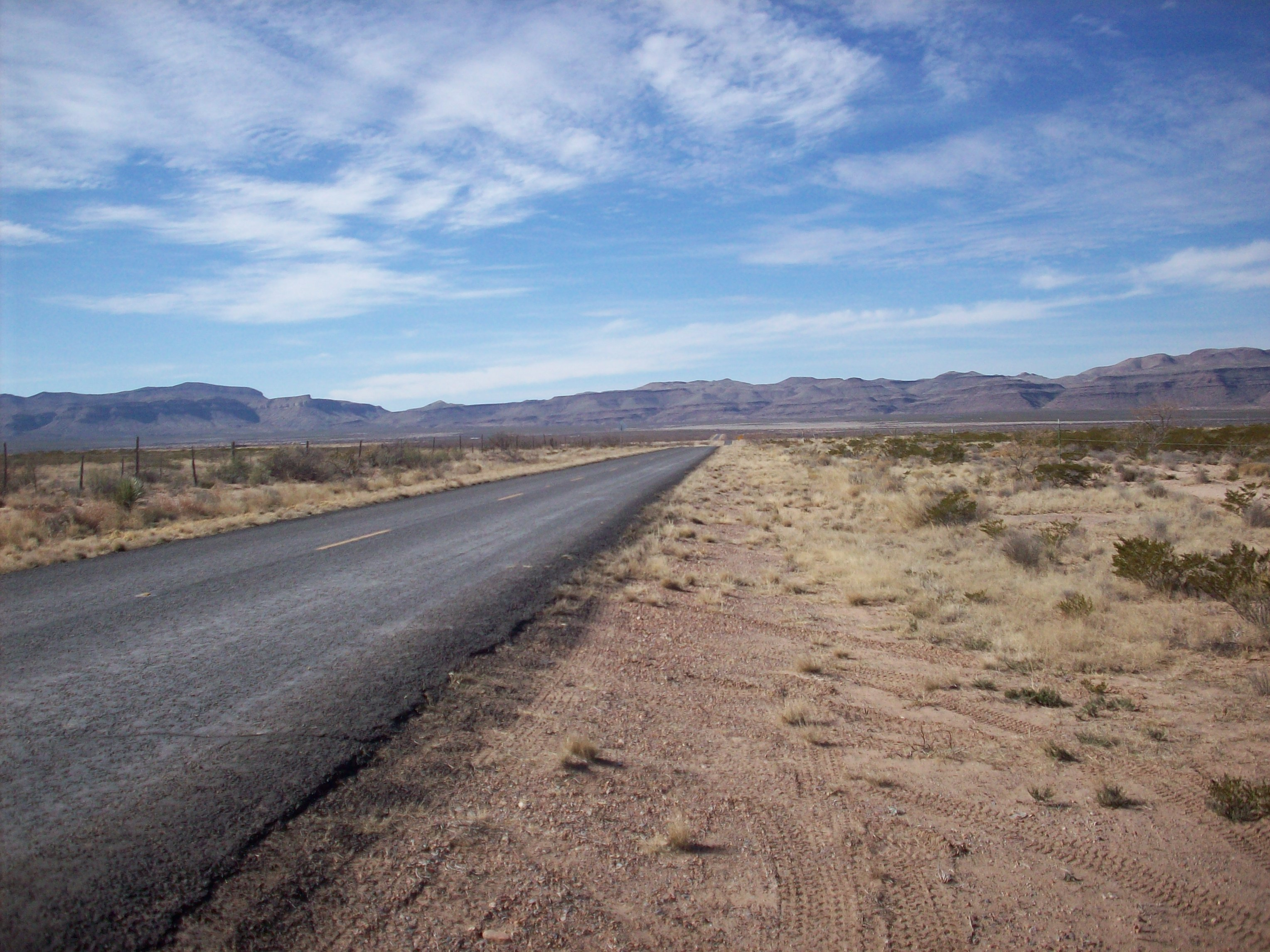
- South and North

Highest point
- Peak: Capote Peak
- Elevation: 6,212 ft (1,893 m)
- Coordinates: 30°17′N 104°33′W

Dimensions
- Length: 16 mi (26 km)

Geography
- Country: United States
- State: Texas

Geology
- Rock type: Igneous

The Sierra Vieja is a small mountain range in the Trans-Pecos region of West Texas, 42 miles or 68 kilometers northwest of the city of Marfa in far western Jeff Davis County and northwestern Presidio County. The range extends 16 miles or 26 kilometers south, from just east of the Van Horn Mountains. Locally known as the Candelaria Rim Rock, the Sierra Vieja comprise the southernmost tip of the Southern Rocky Mountains in North America. Sierra vieja is Spanish for "old mountains".

Capote Peak is the most prominent in the range and is located 14 miles or 23 kilometers northwest of Ranch to Market Road 2810. It has an elevation of 6,212 feet or 1,893 meters above sea level, with its summit rising 1,882 feet or 574 meters above nearby Capote Creek. The peak stands at the southeastern edge of the range. Capote means "cloak" or "cape", referring to the fog and mist that occasionally surround the peak. Local folklore recounts that the name may be related to the Lipan Apache Chief Capote, who lived in the region around 1850.

== Cultural history ==
Archaeological evidence indicates a long history of human presence in the Sierra Vieja. When Cabeza de Vaca, the first European to explore the Big Bend in 1535, traveled up the Rio Grande, he encountered a large Native American population. The extensive number of Indian sites along Walker Creek and Capote Creek are also evidence of human occupation for thousands of years. In later years, the Apache resided in the Sierra Vieja. The Native American presence in the area hindered cattle ranching until the final years of the 19th century. The Sierra Vieja rim has long served as an unofficial boundary, with Spanish language and culture prevailing west of the range on both sides of the Rio Grande. The range largely remains within the boundaries of several large ranches.

== Geology and vegetation ==
Large-scale silicic volcanism began in the Sierra Vieja about 39 million years ago and continued until about 35 million years ago, with the range being composed of a sequence of tertiary flow and pyroclastic rocks. The shallow, stony soils in the Sierra Vieja support live oak, piñon pine, juniper, conifer, cacti, and grasses. The mountains are also home to the Hinckley columbine. The plant has fern-like, delicate foliage and canary-yellow flowers. It grows to about 3.5 feet or 1.1 meters tall and is endemic to a single site, Capote Falls in the Sierra Vieja. Capote Falls, located on spring-fed Capote Creek, is the highest waterfall in Texas at 175 feet or 53 meters. Despite its location in one of the driest parts of the state, it is the main drainage below the Rio Grande Rift and the Sierra Vieja on its way to the Rio Grande, and as such, it flows consistently. The waterfall is located on private property.
