= Sitting Bull Falls =

Waterfalls in New Mexico, United States

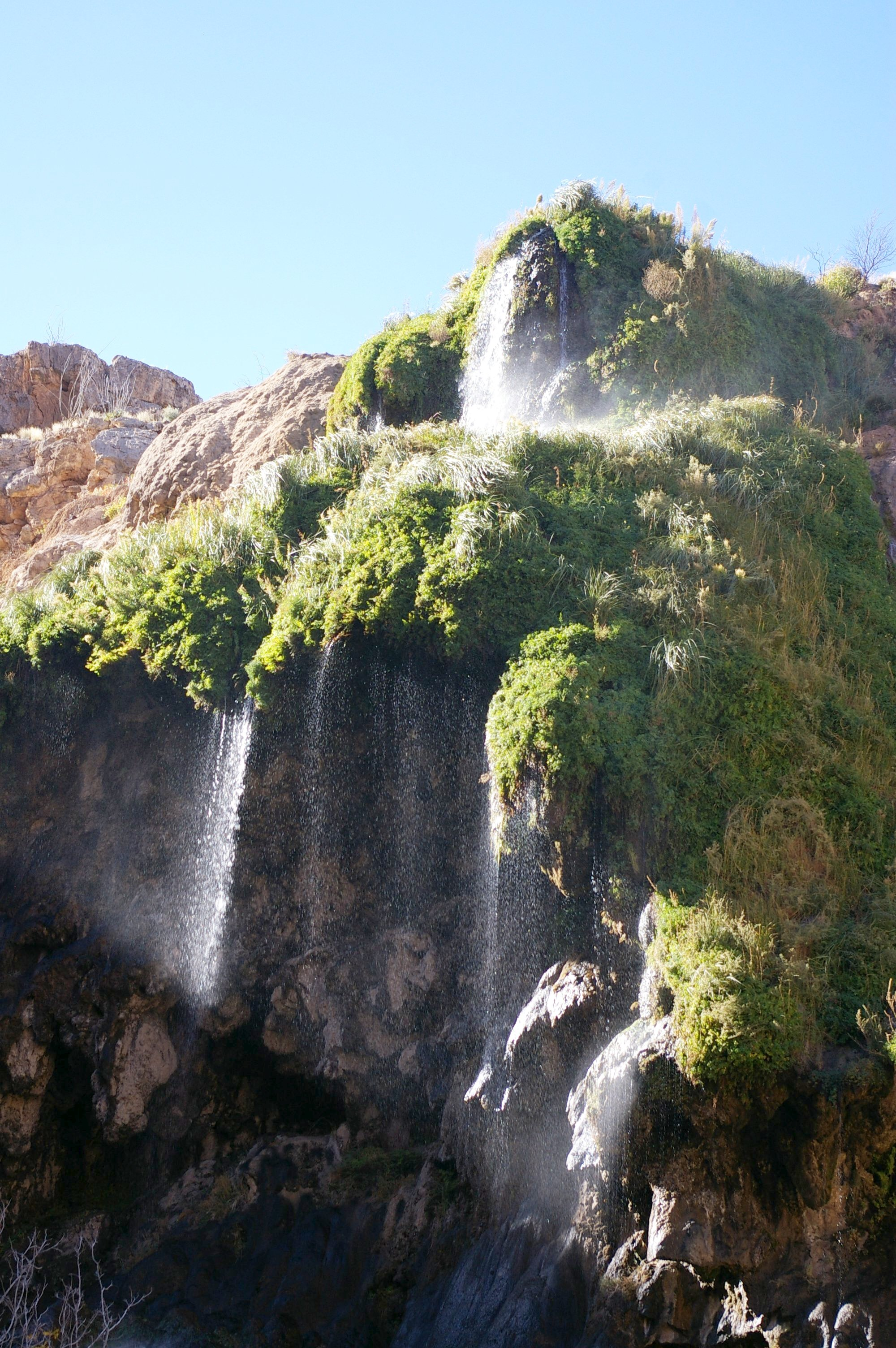
- View of Sitting Bull Falls from below.

- Location within New Mexico
- Location: Eddy, New Mexico, United States
- Coordinates: 32°14′43″N 104°41′47″W
- Elevation: 5,000 ft (1,500 m)
- Governing body: United States Department of Agriculture

Sitting Bull Falls is a series of waterfalls located in a canyon in the Lincoln National Forest southwest of the city of Carlsbad, New Mexico. The United States Department of Agriculture's Forest Service maintains a popular recreation area for day use at the location of the falls.

The falls are fed by springs located in the canyon above. The water flows through a series of streams and pools until reaching the falls where it drops 150 feet into the canyon below. Most of the water disappears into the gravel or cracks in the rocks and either reappears in springs further down the canyon or joins the Pecos Valley underground water supply.

The area around Sitting Bull Falls is the remnant of a reef system known as the Capitan Great Barrier Reef dating from the Permian period. Approximately 250 million years ago, the region was located near the edge of an inland sea.

The origin of the name Sitting Bull Falls remains uncertain. One version holds that the falls were named after a Sioux medicine man. The Apache name for the area is gostahanagunti which means hidden gulch.

A number of hiking trails allow visitors access to the springs above the falls. A paved path connects the picnic area to the area around the bottom of the falls where wading and swimming are allowed. Additionally, there are a number of caves in the area which require special permits to visit.

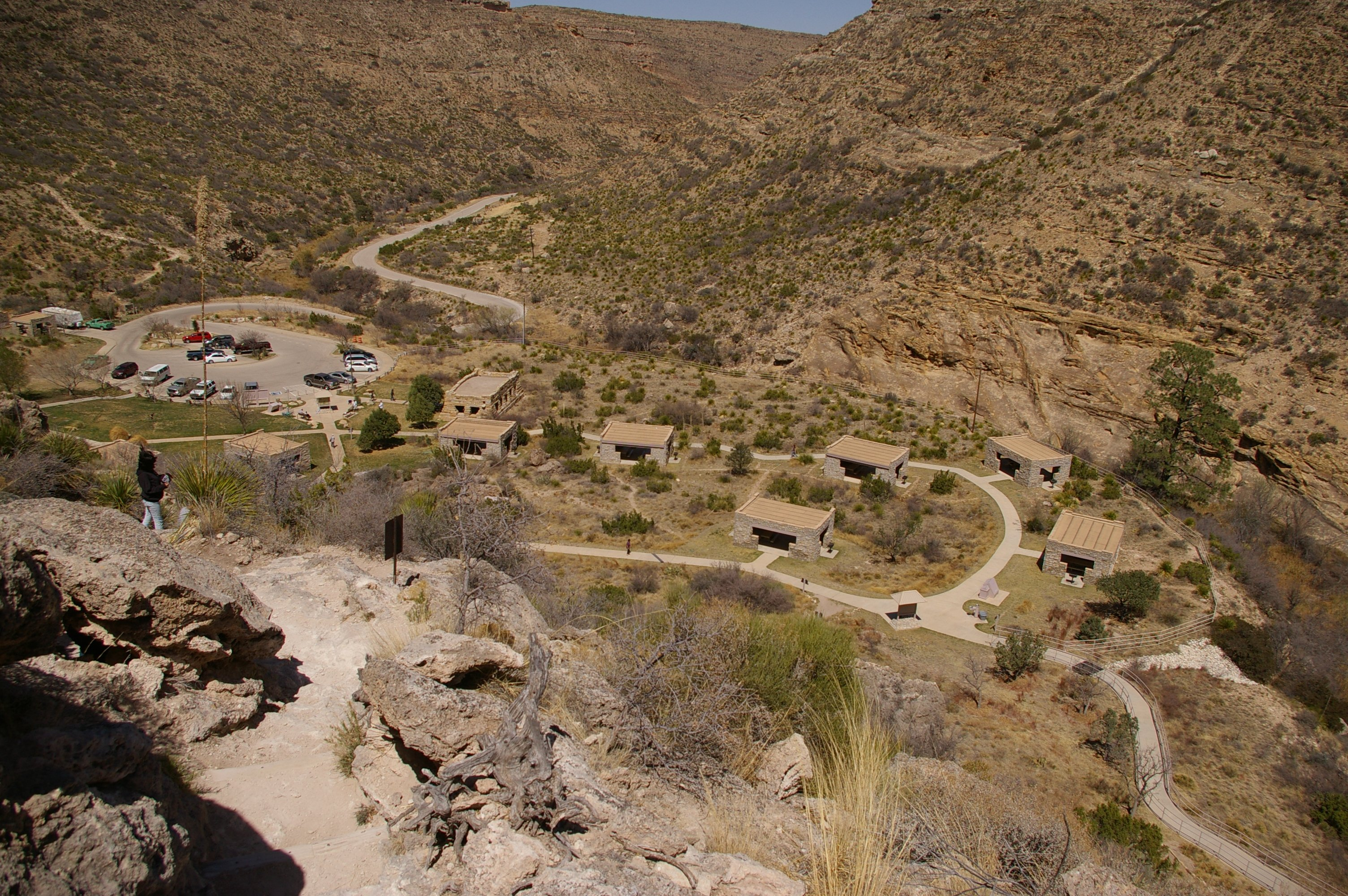
Day Use Area

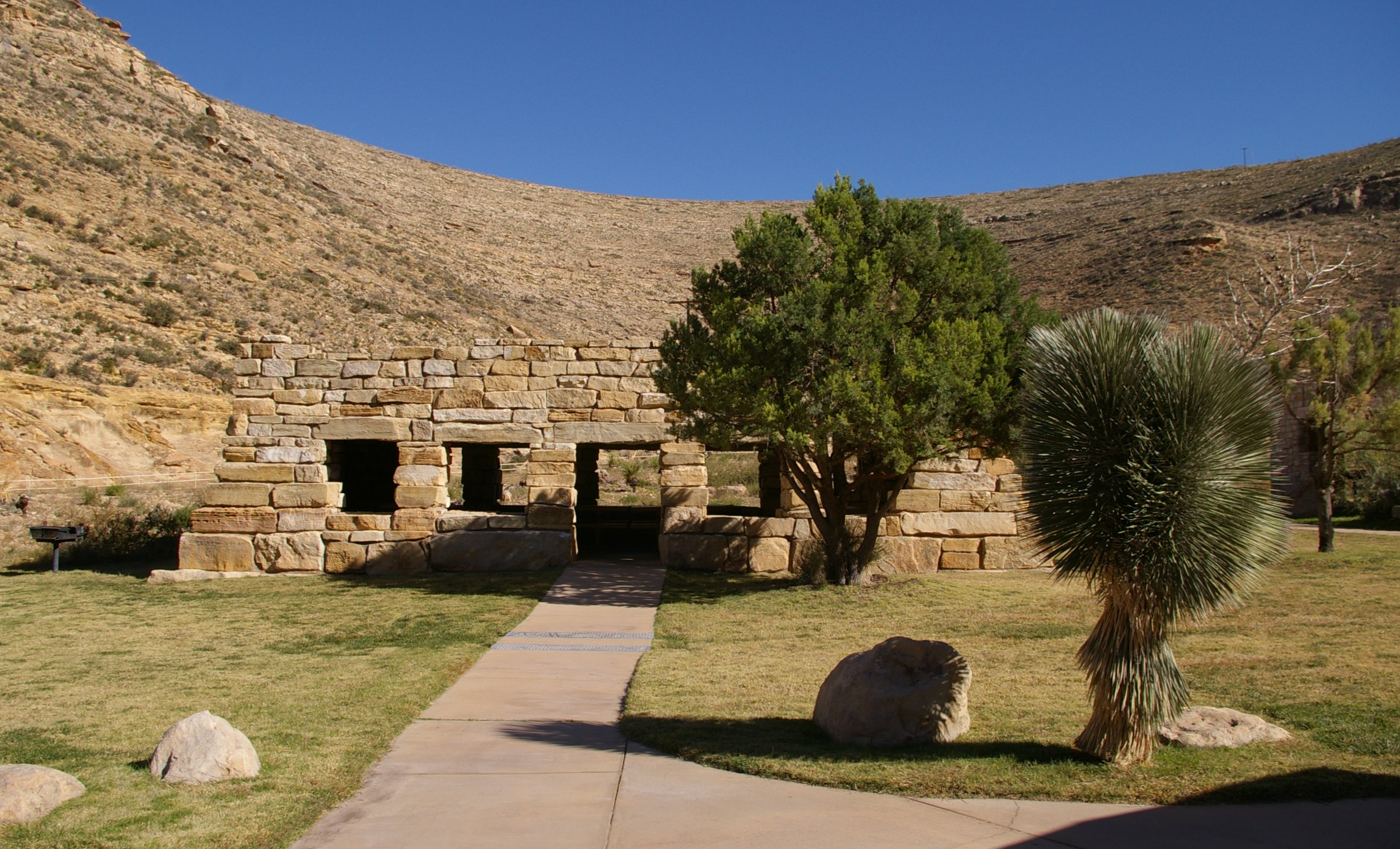
Picnic Shelter after restoration

In 1940, the Civilian Conservation Corps constructed a number of stone buildings which are part of the parking and picnic area. A time capsule located in front of one of the buildings was dedicated on March 24, 1999 and will be opened on the 100th anniversary of the Civilian Conservation Corps' construction in the area. The day use area was closed from April 27, 2011 through April 6, 2012 due to damage from a wildfire in the area. A number of the shelters were repaired after fire had damaged them. Some signs of the fire can still be seen in the area.

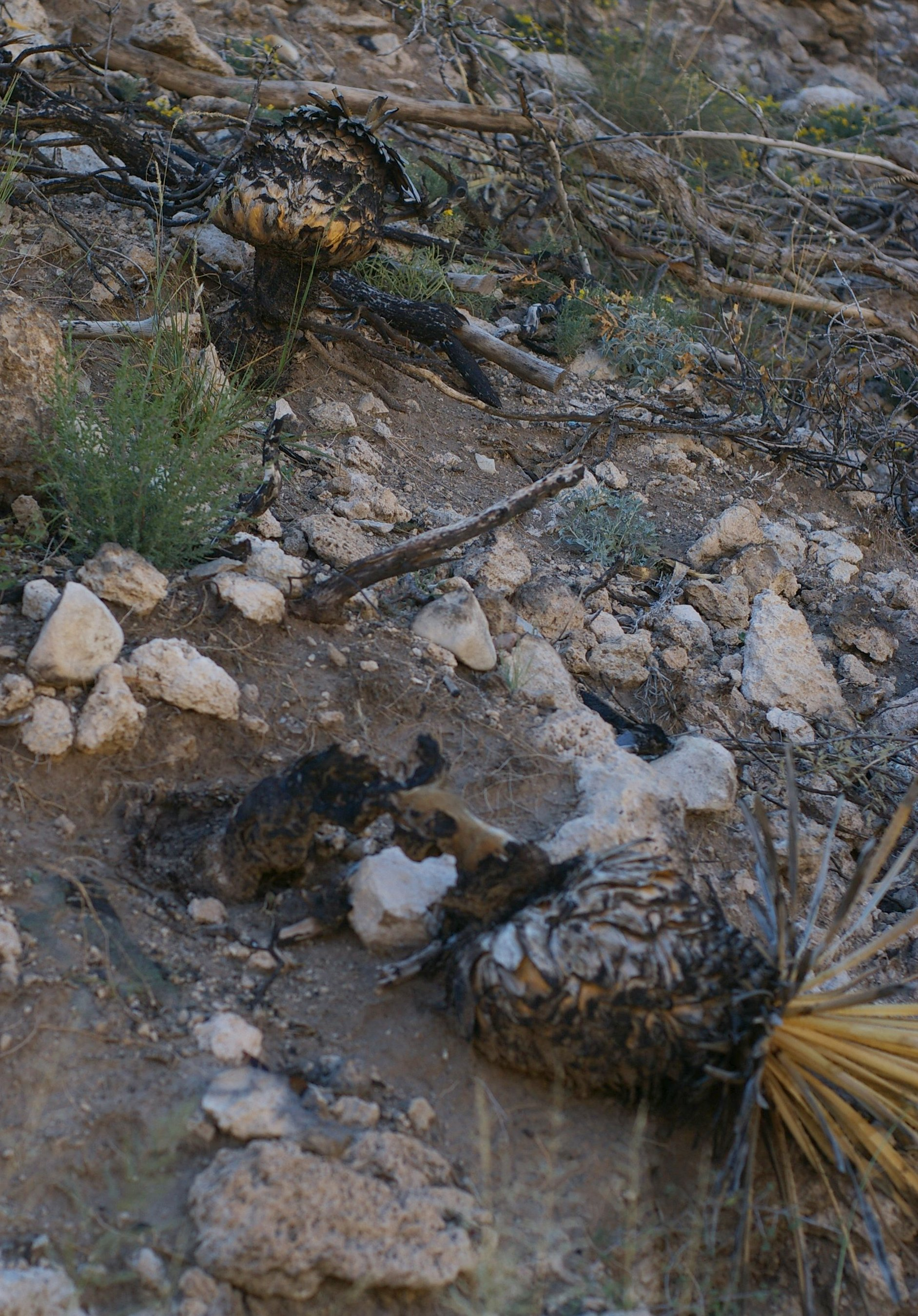
Yucca plants that burned during the wildfire

Video of Sitting Bull Falls

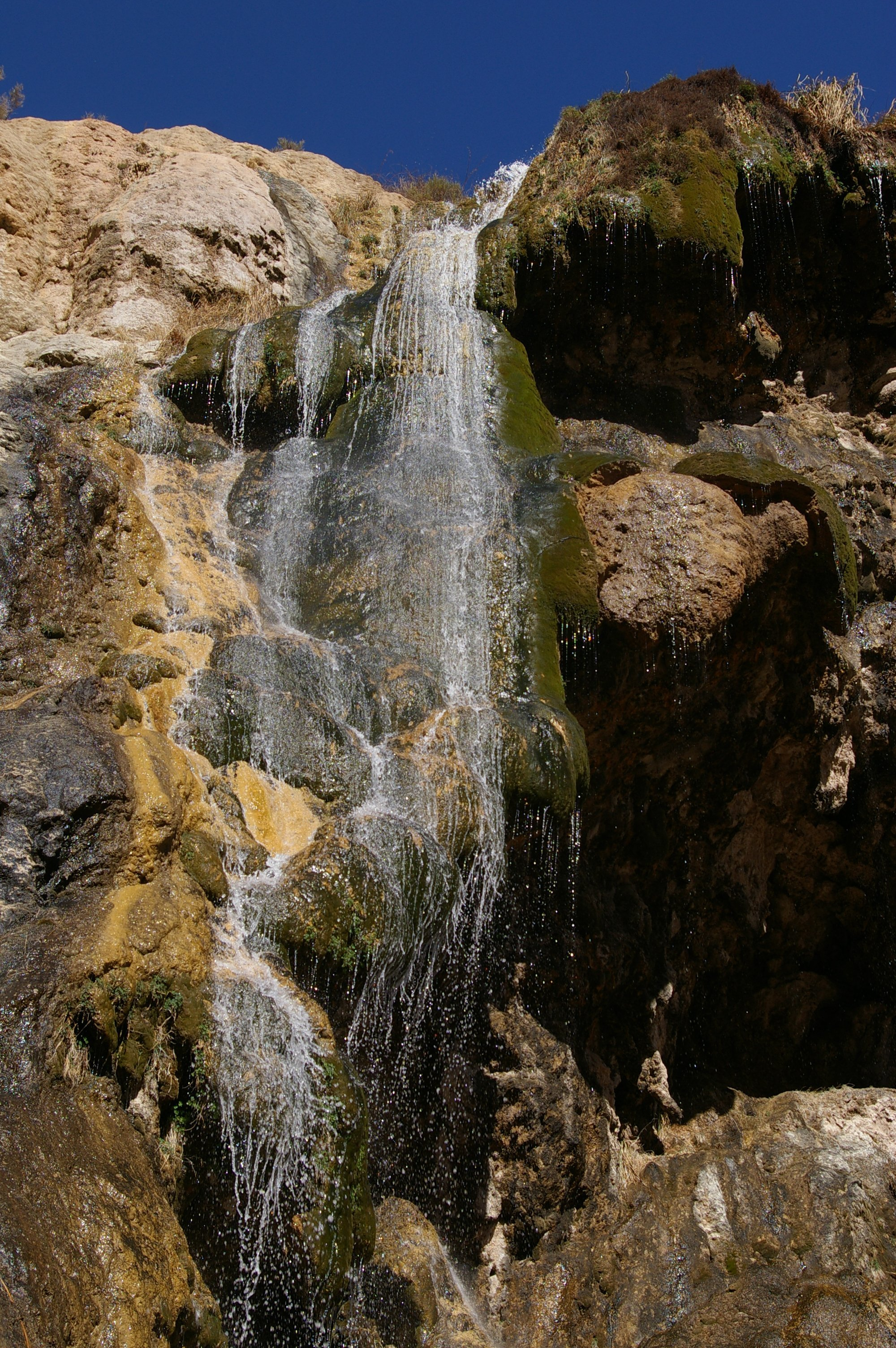
Sitting Bull Falls

== See also ==
- List of waterfalls
