= Lady Bird Johnson Wildflower Center =

State botanical garden and arboretum in Austin, Texas, United States

Coordinates: 30°11′07″N 97°52′14″W

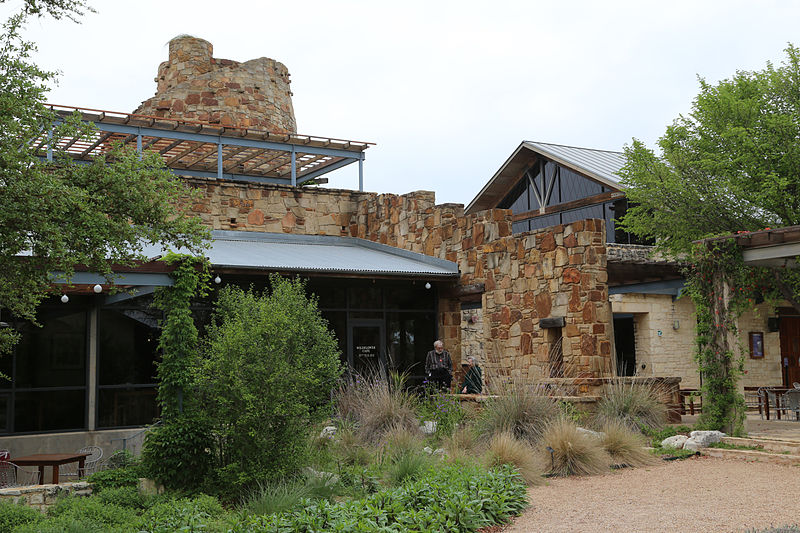
- Interactive map of Lady Bird Johnson Wildflower Center
- Type: Botanical garden, Arboretum
- Location: 4801 La Crosse Avenue; Austin, Texas 78739
- Area: 284 acres (115 ha)
- Established: 1982
- Founder: Lady Bird Johnson & Helen Hayes
- Owner: University of Texas at Austin
- Visitors: 185,783
- Species: 970+ plant species
- Parking: Parking lot onsite
- Public transit: Violet Crown Trail
- Other information: Former name, National Wildflower Research Center (1982–1995)
- Website: www.wildflower.org

The Lady Bird Johnson Wildflower Center at The University of Texas at Austin is the state botanical garden and arboretum of Texas. The center features more than 900 species of native Texas plants in both garden and natural settings and is home to a breadth of educational programs and events. The center is 284 acres and located 10 miles southwest of downtown Austin, Texas just inside the edge of the distinctive Texas Hill Country. It straddles both Edwards Plateau and Texas Blackland Prairies ecosystems.

The center is dedicated to "inspiring the conservation of native plants" and promoting the environmental benefits of native plant landscapes. It is home to the most comprehensive native plant database in the U.S., which features profiles of more than 9,000 North American native plants along with a number of other resources (see Native Plants of North America).

The Wildflower Center has 9 acres of cultivated gardens, including the Luci and Ian Family Garden and the Ann and O.J. Weber Pollinator Habitat Garden. Its 16-acre Mollie Steves Zachry Texas Arboretum features collections of tree and shrub species from across the state of Texas. Miles of walking trails, educational exhibits, a gift store, cafe and biannual sales of native plants round out the offerings. In 2013, the syndicated television series, Texas Country Reporter, hosted by Bob Phillips, declared the center the number one site from which to view wildflowers within Texas.

== History ==
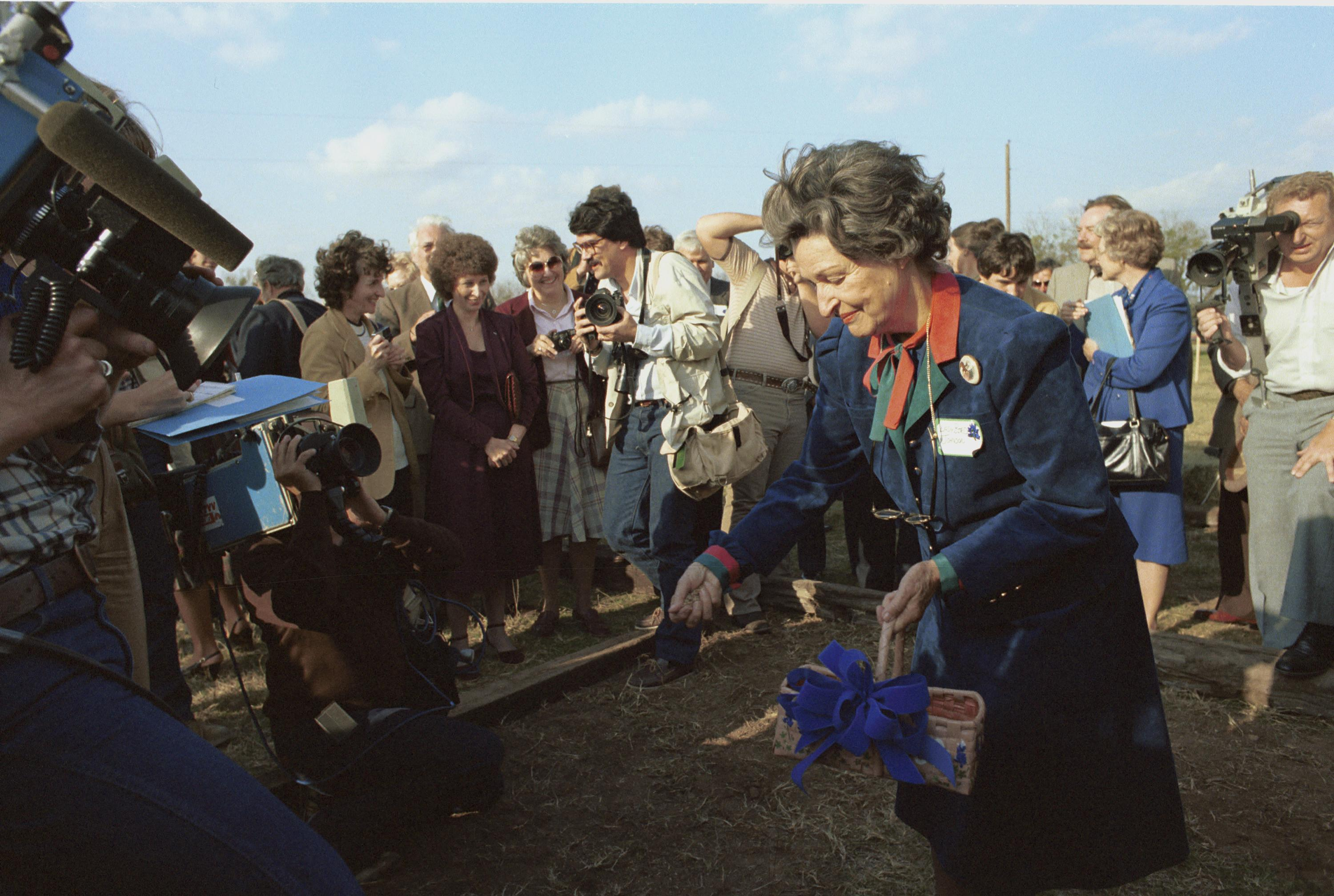
Lady Bird Johnson spreads seeds at the groundbreaking of the National Wildflower Research Center.

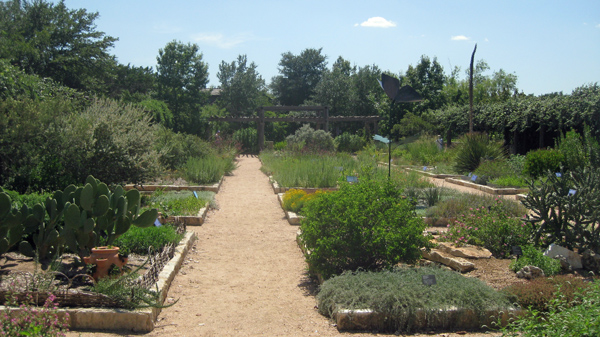
Native Texas plants on display.

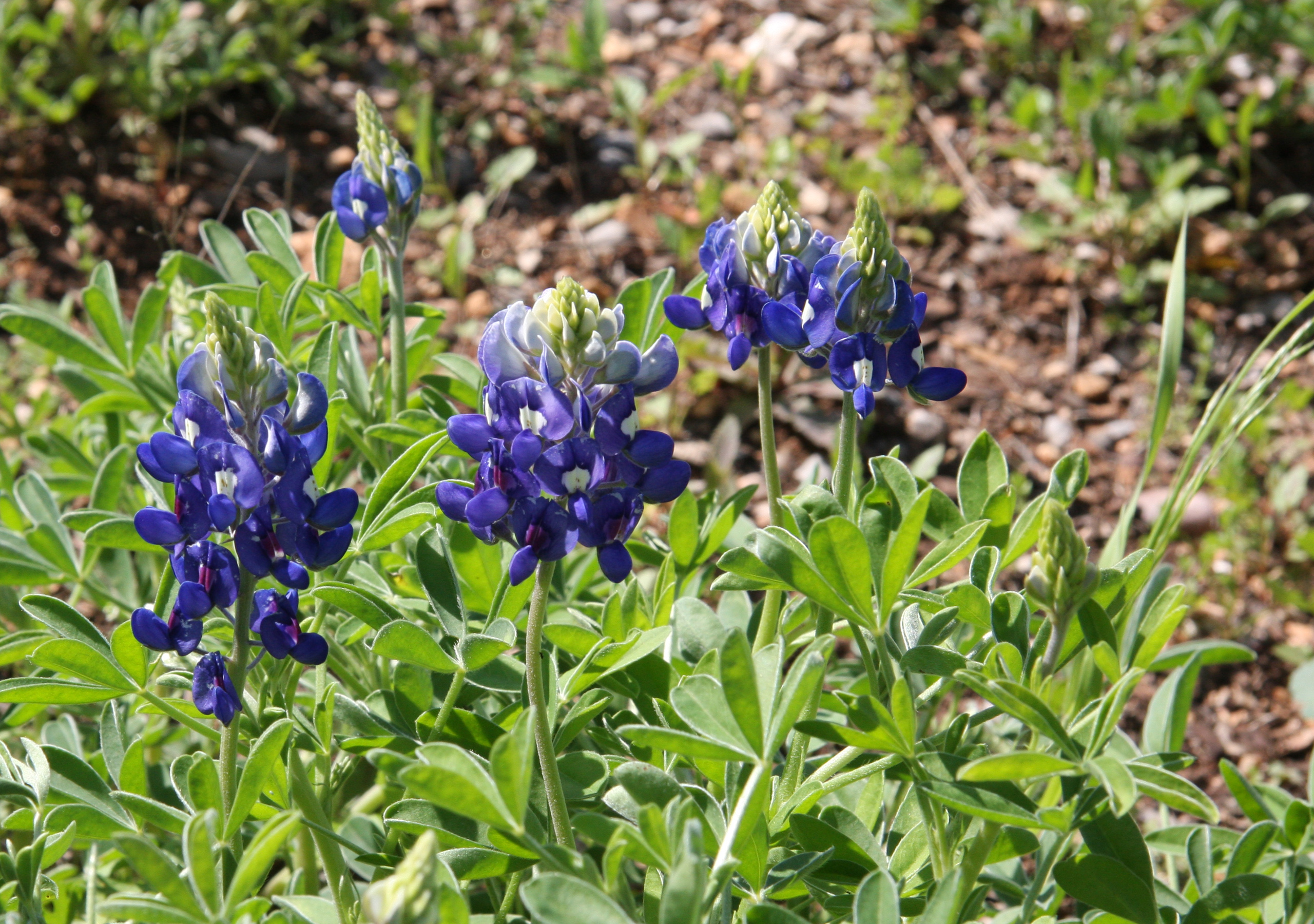
Texas bluebonnet grows along trails around the Wildflower Center.

Former first lady Lady Bird Johnson and actress Helen Hayes founded the National Wildflower Research Center in 1982 to protect and preserve North America's native plants and natural landscapes.

The original center was located on a 60-acre site in East Austin. Public demand to view native gardens and learn more about native plants soon overwhelmed the original site, and led the board of directors to build a larger campus to accommodate public interest.

The current campus opened in 1995 on a 42-acre site in Southwest Austin on La Crosse Avenue. Five acres of native plant gardens and landscapes, designed by J. Robert Anderson, FASLA (principal), Eleanor McKinney (EMLA) and Darrel Morrison (FASLA), were installed throughout a complex of award-winning buildings designed by Overland Partners to reflect the land and regional architecture of the Texas Hill Country.

The center was officially renamed the Lady Bird Johnson Wildflower Center in 1997. The Texas Legislature designated the center as the state botanical garden and arboretum, effective September 1, 2017.

By 2002, in response to rapidly encroaching land development, the center acquired an additional 237 acres of adjacent land through purchase and donation. This expansion of the campus made possible the development of larger scale research on the ecology of the Central Texas region and how best to restore healthy landscapes in the region. It also established education and public outreach as core functions of the center.

The inscription on the Presidential Medal of Freedom award presented to Lady Bird Johnson in 1977 by President Gerald Ford concludes with the words "Her leadership transformed the American landscape and preserved its natural beauty as a national treasure." The Wildflower Center joined The University of Texas at Austin in 2006.

With its focus on native plants, research and education, the Wildflower Center has gained national recognition as a leader in plant conservation and environmental sustainability. In partnership with the U.S. Botanic Garden and American Society of Landscape Architects, the center led the Sustainable Sites Initiative, a program that established performance benchmarks for sustainable land design and is now offered through GBCI. The current mission of the center is "inspiring the conservation of native plants."

== Incorporation and development ==
On June 20, 2006, the University of Texas System Board of Regents announced a plan to incorporate the Wildflower Center into The University of Texas at Austin. In 2010, a donation of $1.4 million from the San Antonio Area Foundation was designated toward the establishment of a 16-acre arboretum. The Mollie Steves Zachry Texas Arboretum, which was dedicated on April 30, 2011, and opened in the spring of 2012, displays all 53 species of oak trees that are native to Texas.

In April 2012, Luci Baines Johnson, daughter of Lady Bird Johnson, and her husband Ian Turpin donated $1 million toward a family garden to be named in their honor. The 4.5-acre native plant garden features a wading creek, a maze of 3-foot-tall native hedges, and a walk-in grotto. It was opened in May 2014.

== Gallery ==
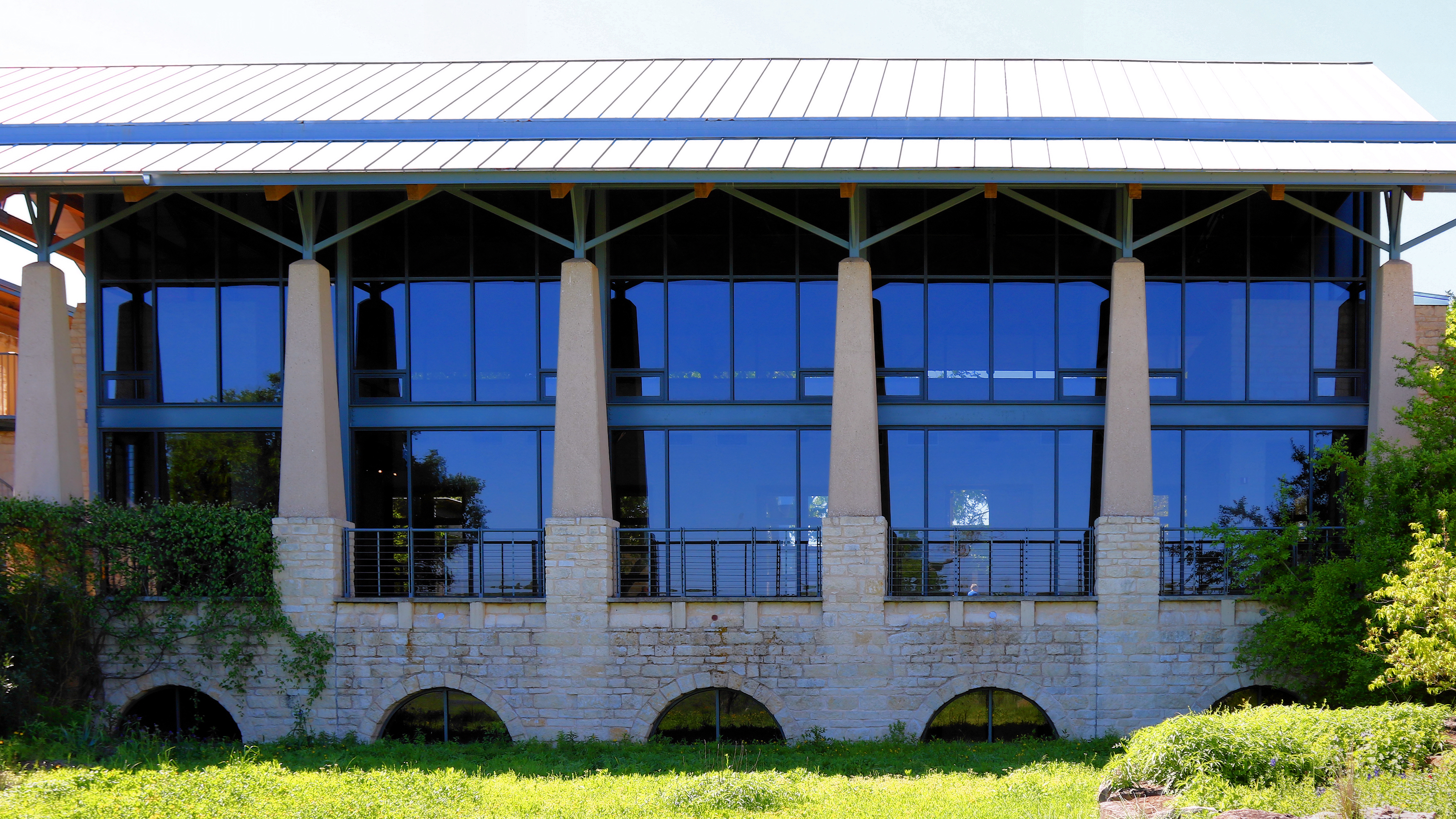
Great Hall

Courtyard spring.

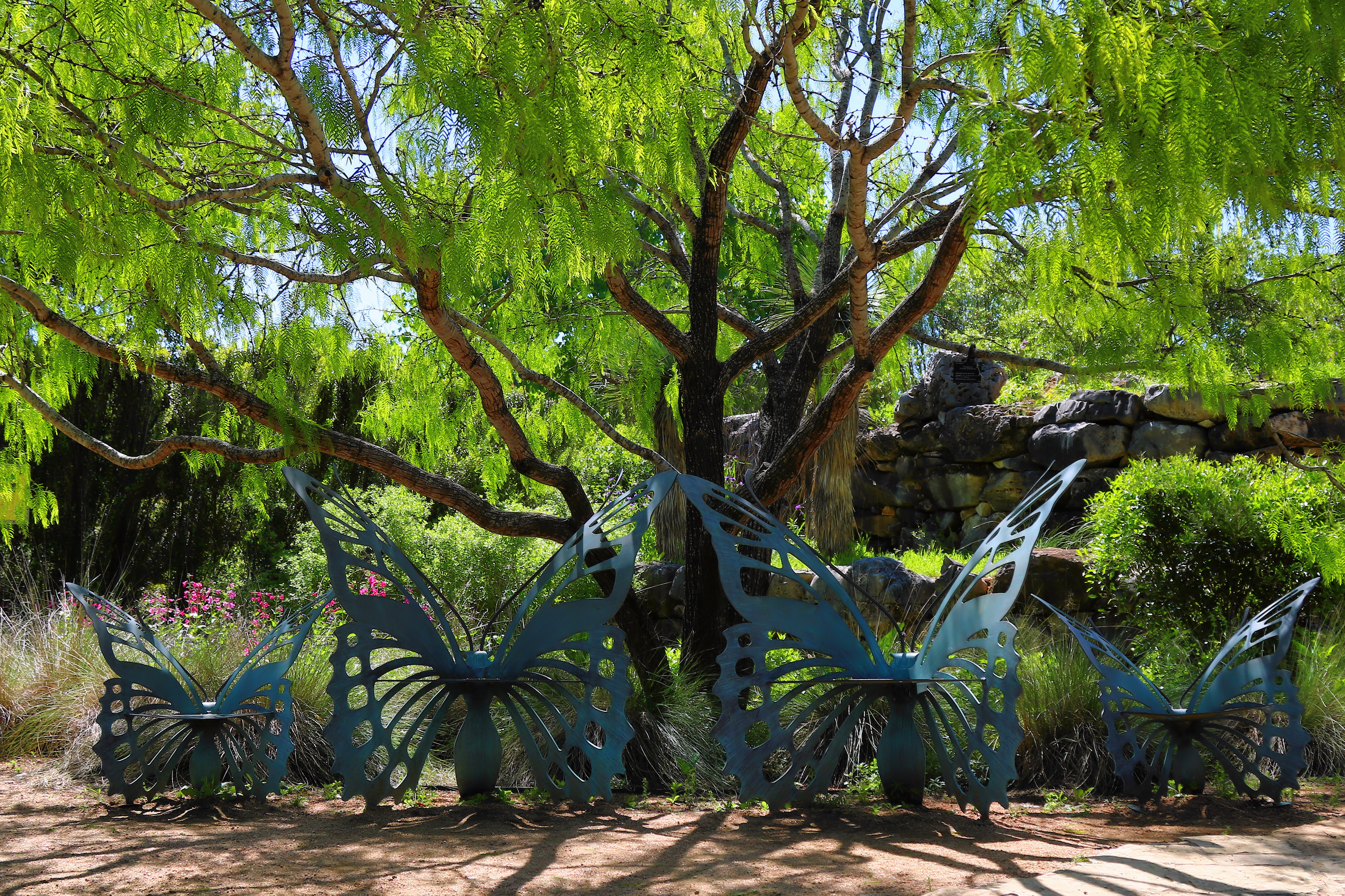
Decorative art garden chairs.

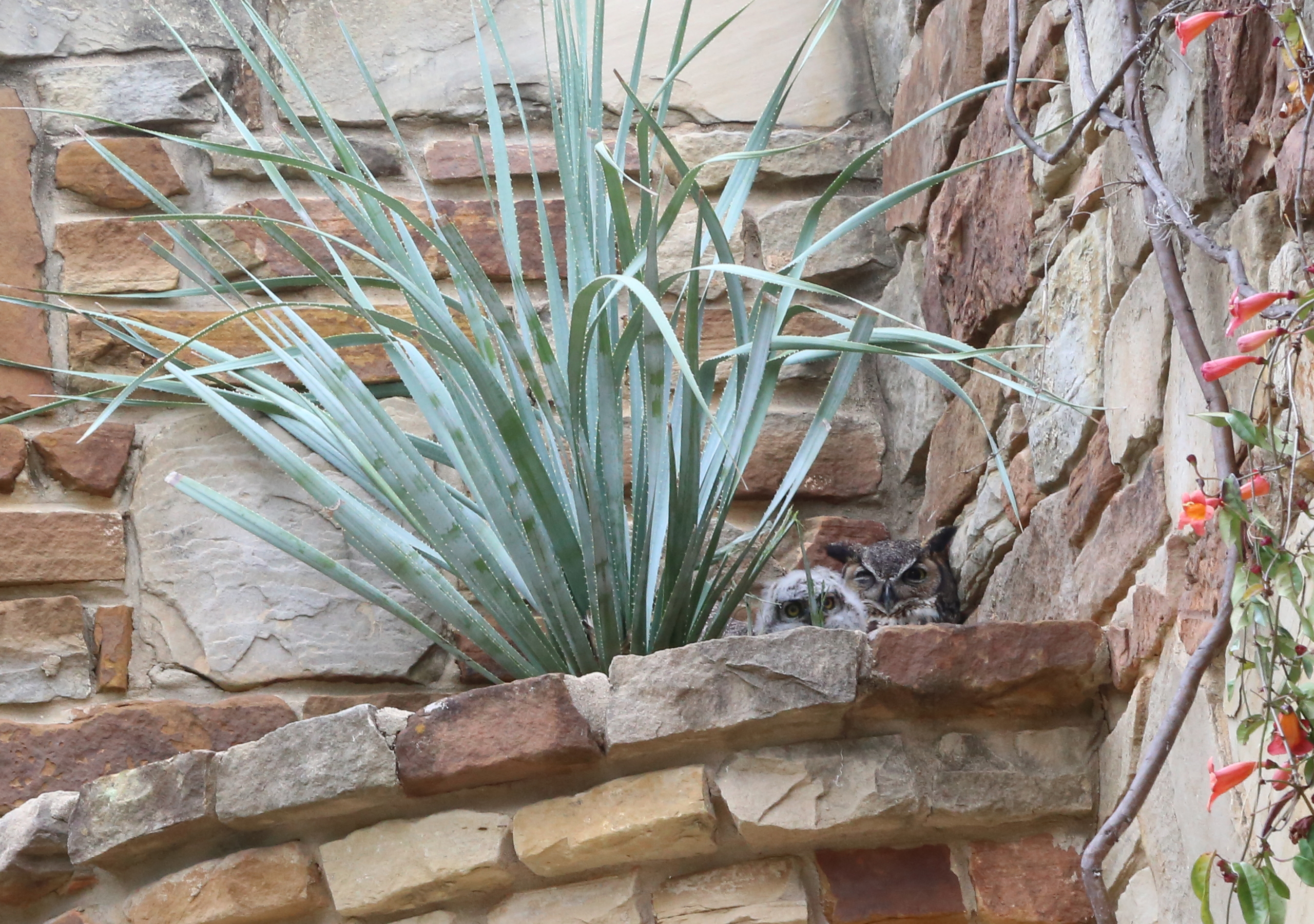
Horned owl and owlet resting above.

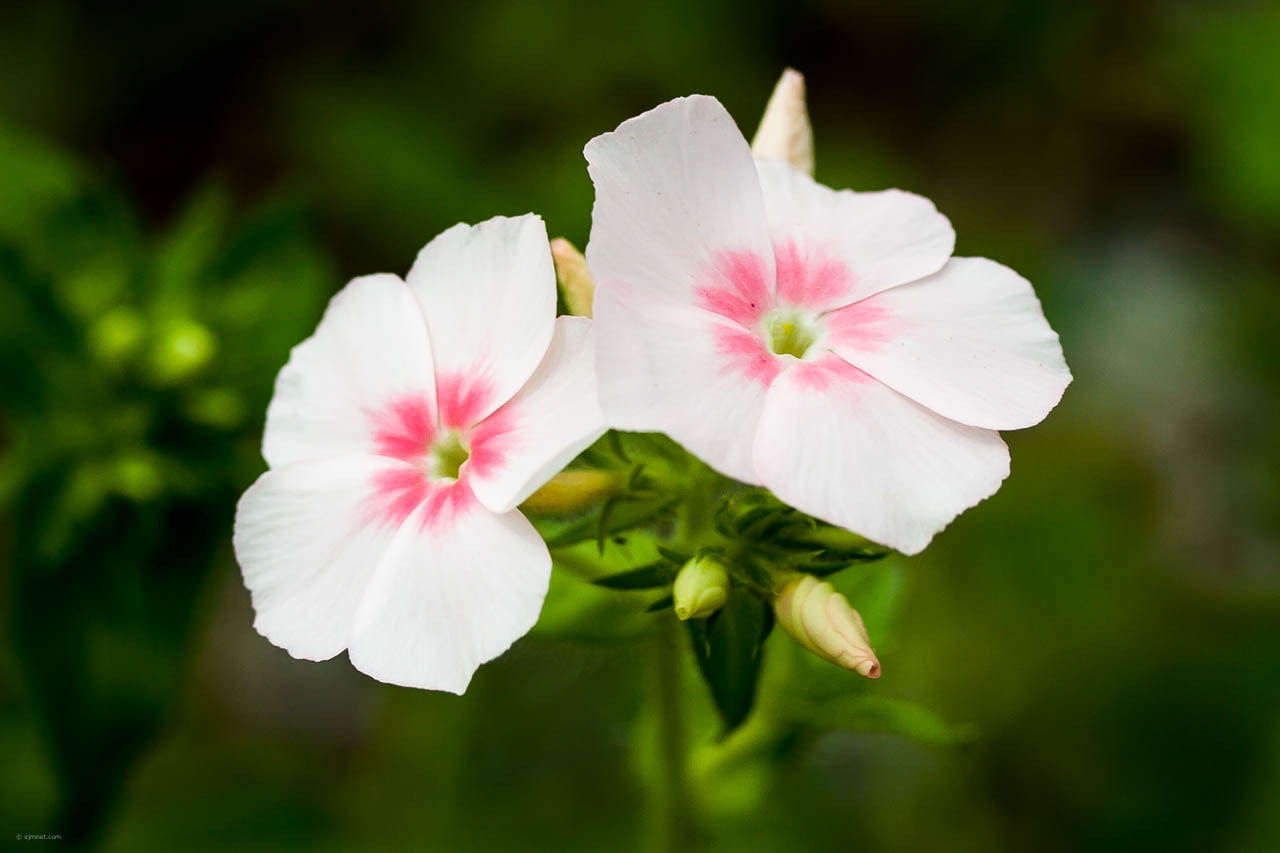
Rose Mallow close-up.

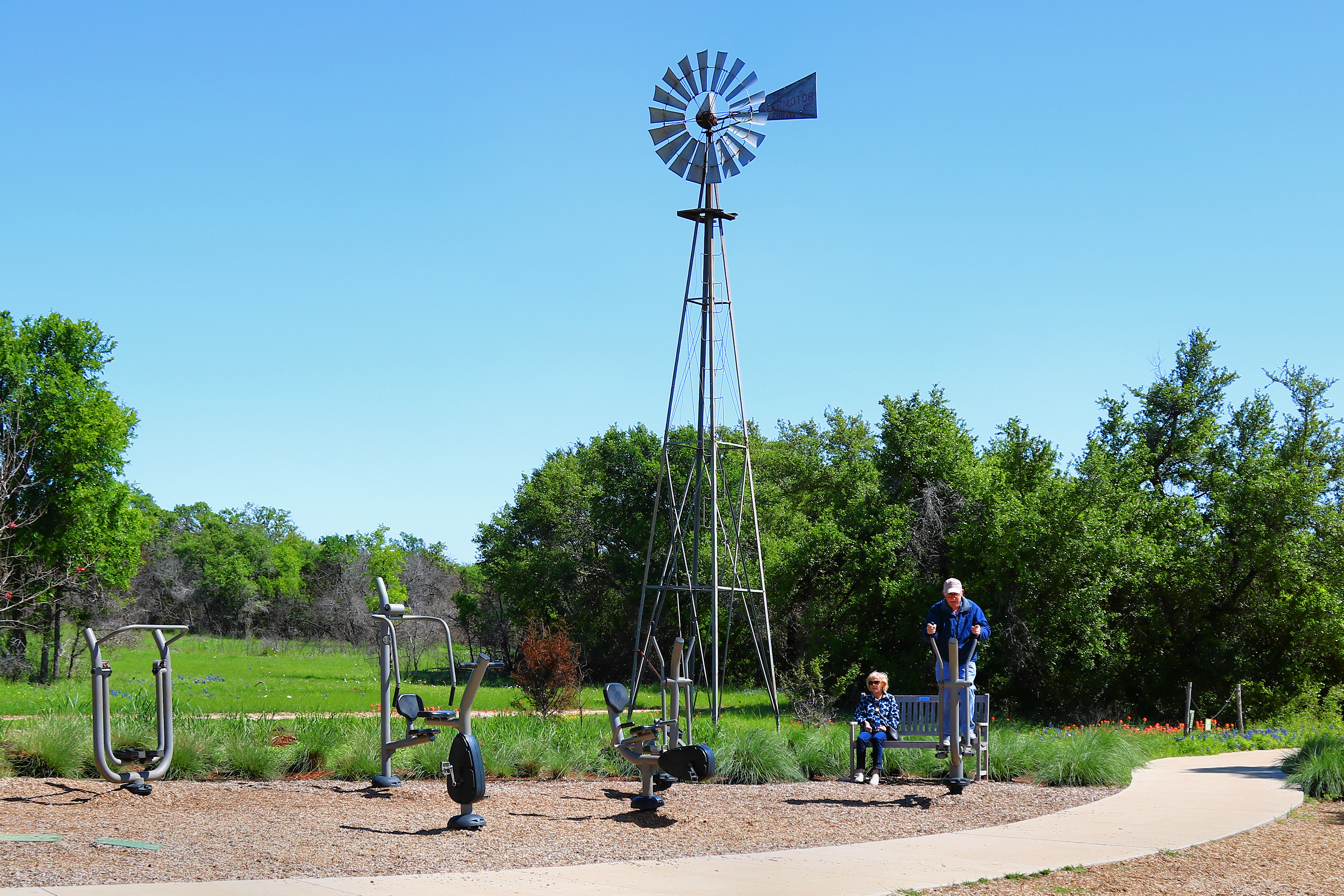
Exercise area.

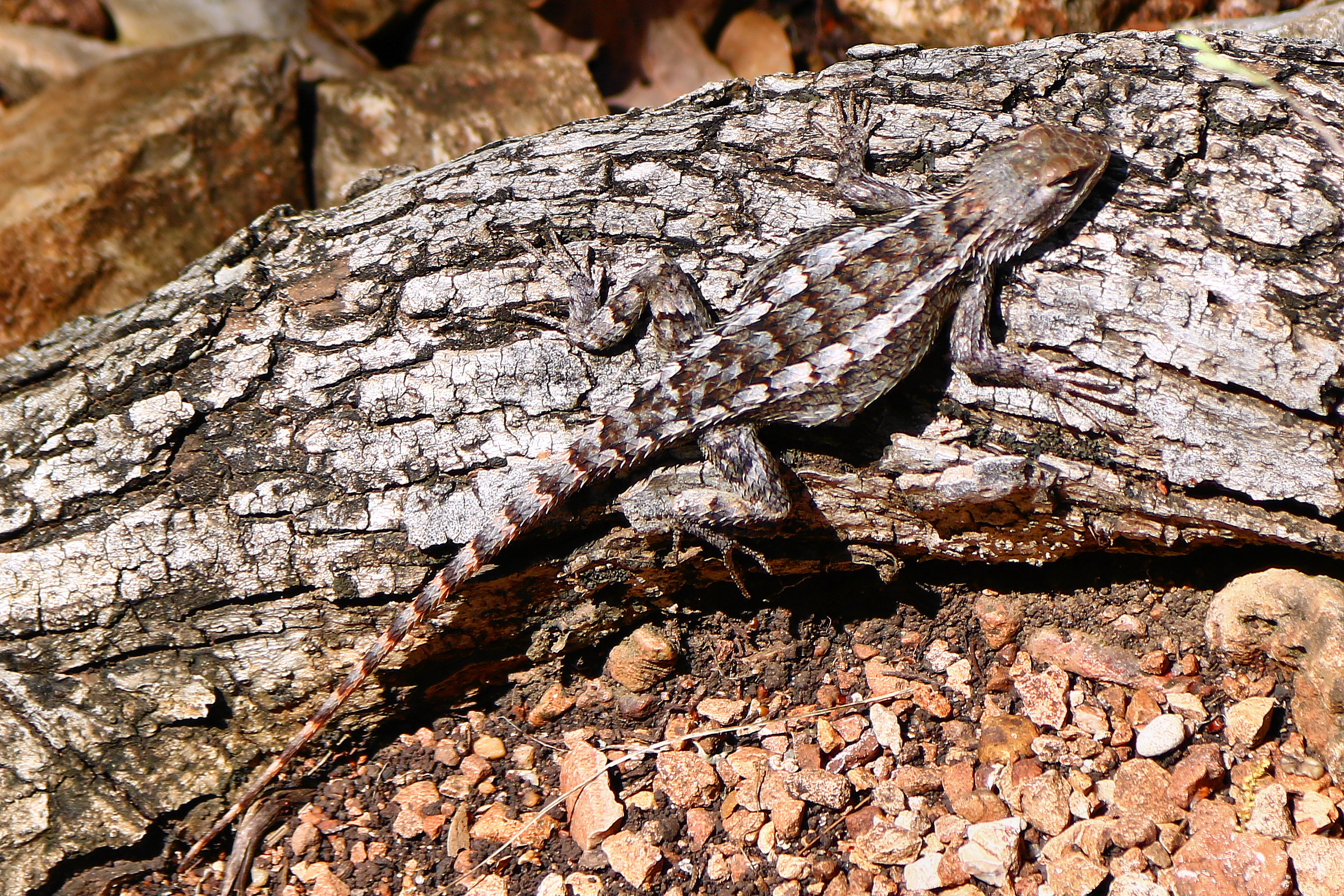
Texas spiny lizard (Sceloporus olivaceus) on a branch.

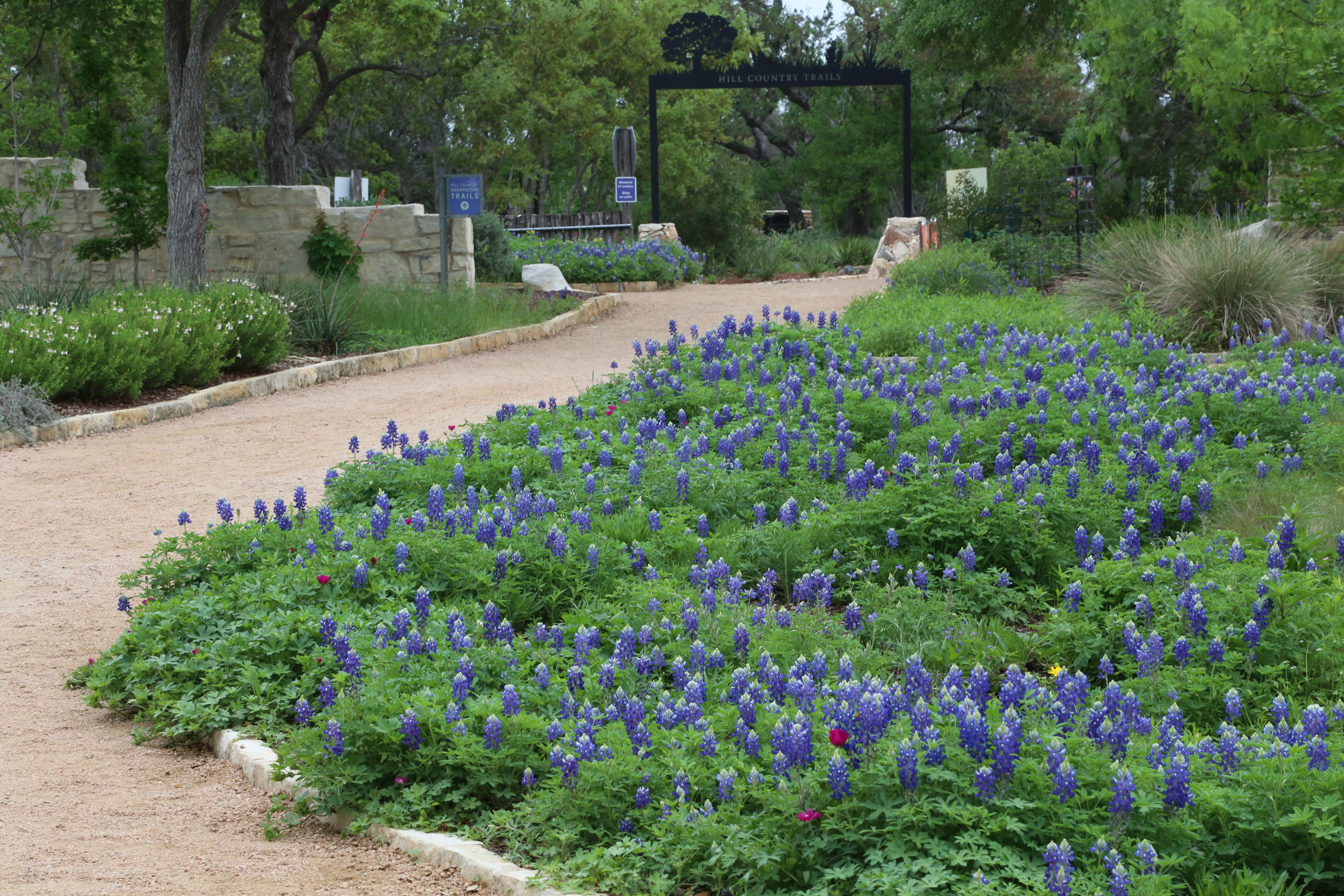
Blue bonnet trail

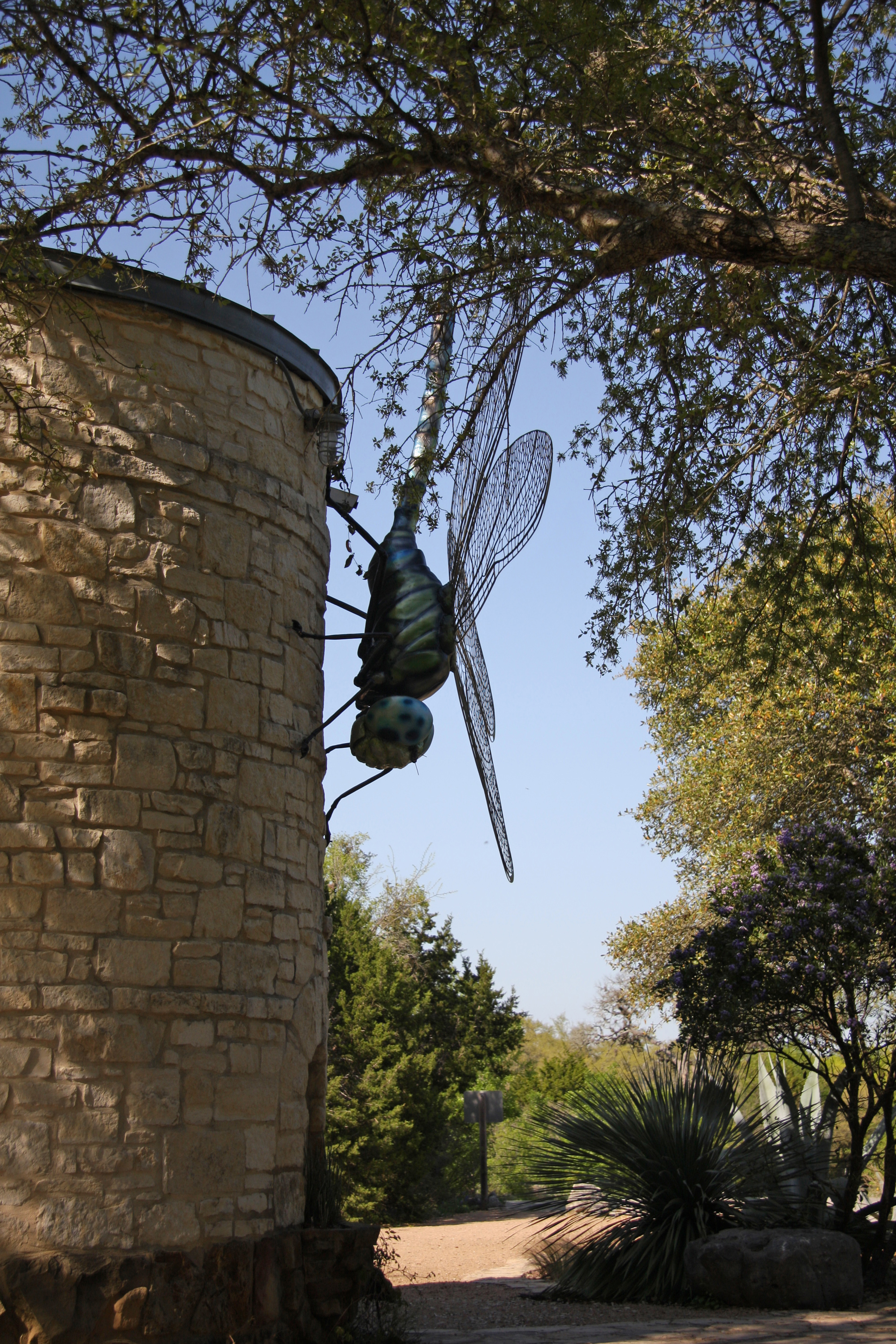
Giant dragonfly sculpture on a limestone water tower.

== See also ==
- List of botanical gardens in the United States
