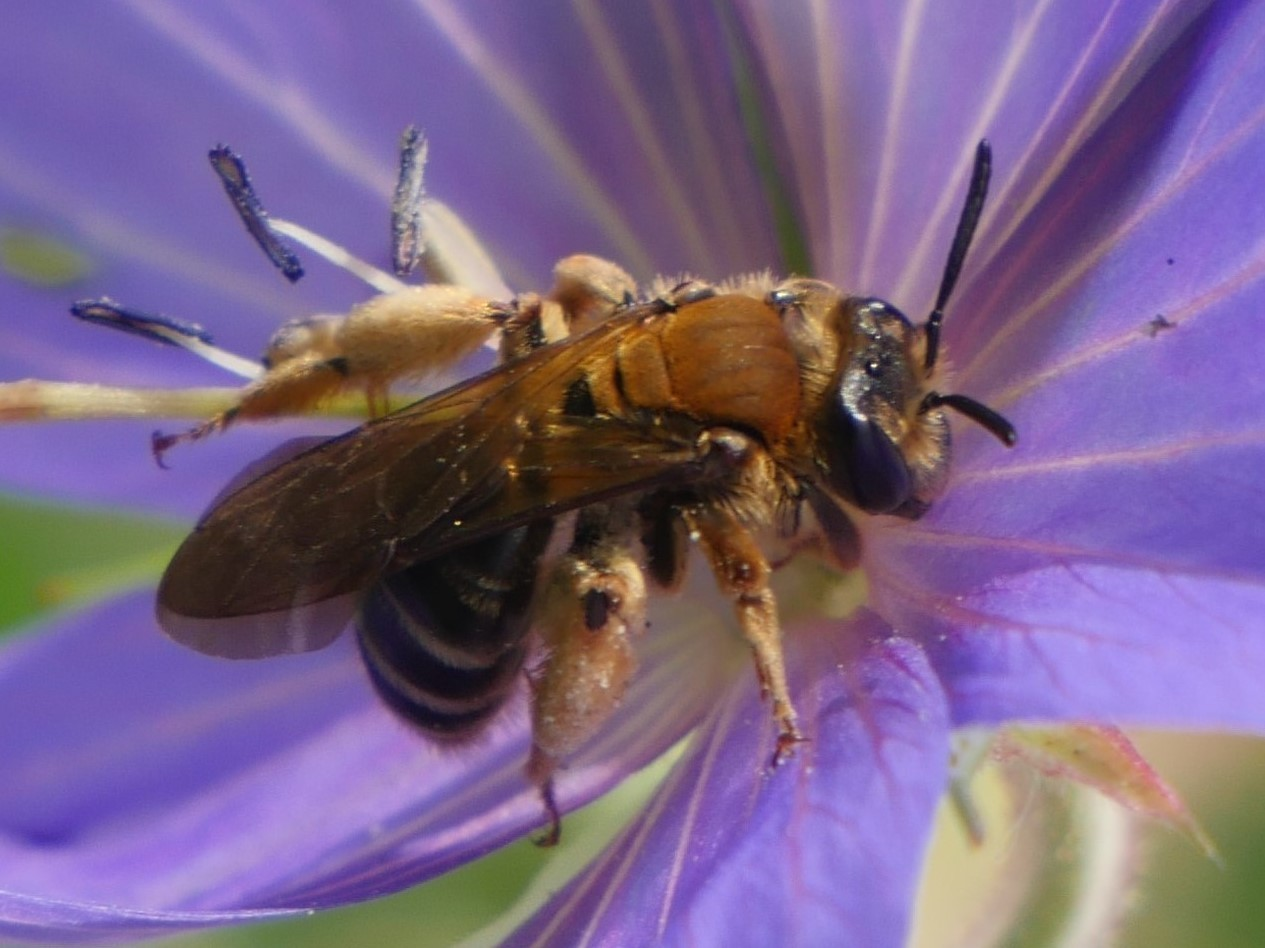

Scientific classification
- Domain: Eukaryota
- Kingdom: Animalia
- Phylum: Arthropoda
- Class: Insecta
- Order: Hymenoptera
- Family: Andrenidae
- Genus: Andrena
- Species: A. curvungula

Binomial name
- Andrena curvungula Thomson, 1870

= Andrena curvungula =

Species of bee

Andrena curvungula is a species of insect belonging to the family Andrenidae. It is a specialist of Campanula flowers and is found in steppe habitats.

It is native to Europe.
