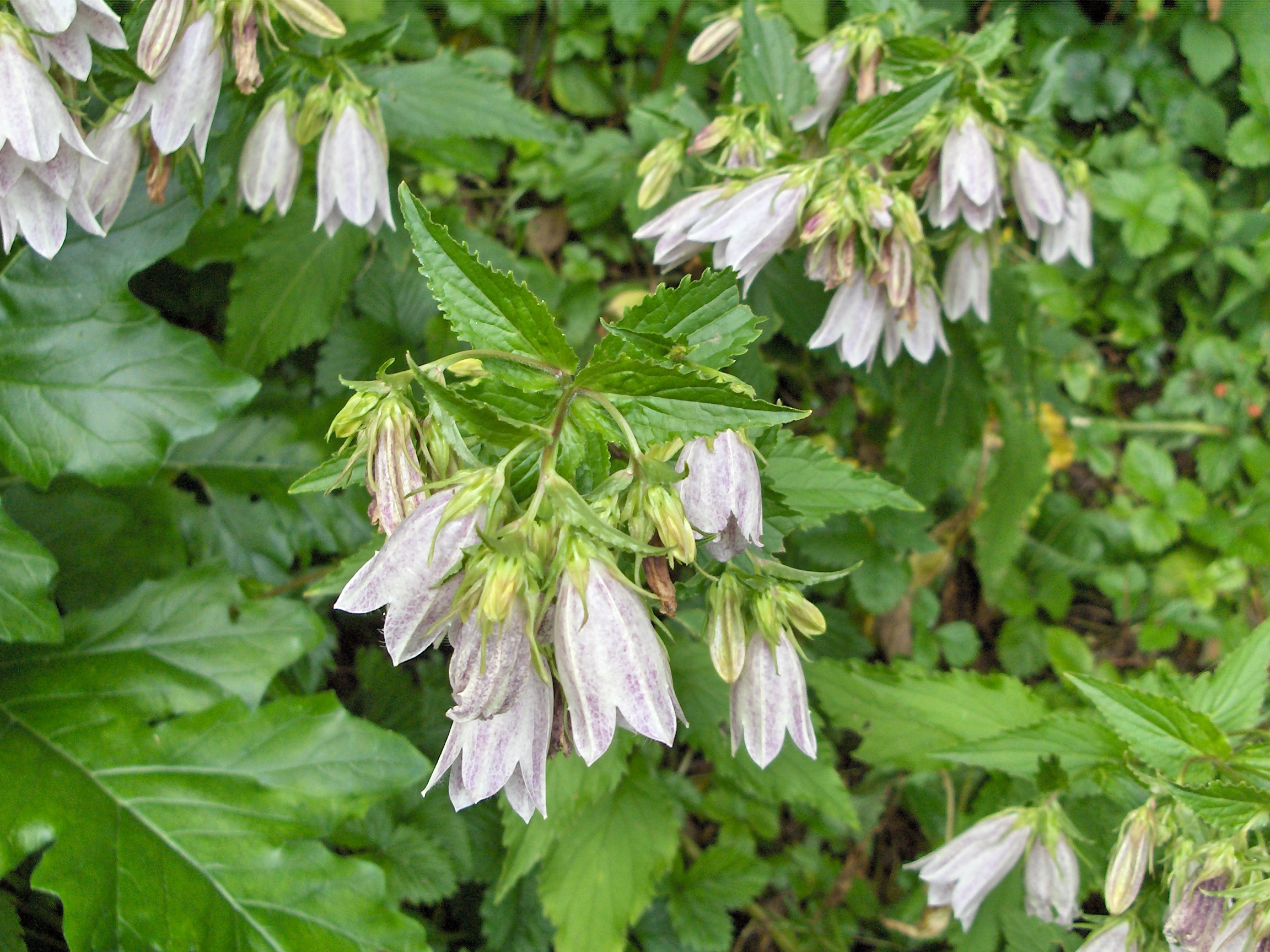

Scientific classification
- Kingdom: Plantae
- Clade: Tracheophytes
- Clade: Angiosperms
- Clade: Eudicots
- Clade: Asterids
- Order: Asterales
- Family: Campanulaceae
- Genus: Campanula
- Species: C. takesimana

Binomial name
- Campanula takesimana Nakai

= Campanula takesimana =

Korean bellflower

Species of flowering plant

Campanula takesimana (Korean bellflower, Korean: 섬초롱꽃, seomchorongkkot) is a species of bellflower. It bears pink to white flowers. There are several cultivars available for the home gardener.

Takesimana is seen as a less invasive alternative to Campanula punctata, its close relation. They are similar in appearance, though the flower shape of takesimana can appear more flared. Both range in colour from white to pink.

The Korean herbal root, doraji (도라지), does not come from this plant, but rather from the Chinese bellflower (Platycodon grandiflorus), although do-ra-ji is usually translated from Korean as "bellflower".
