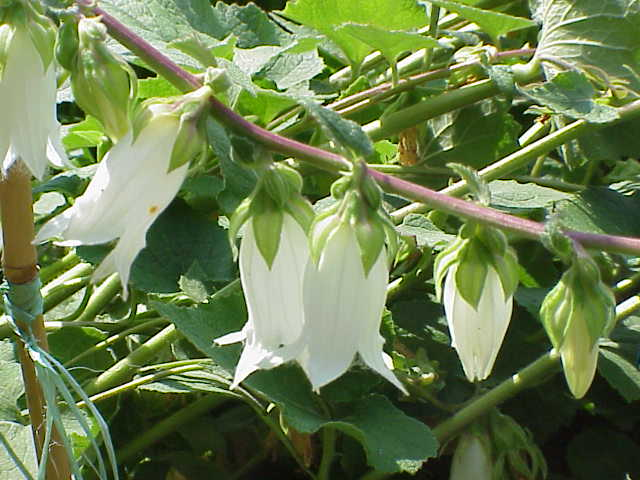

Scientific classification
- Kingdom: Plantae
- Clade: Tracheophytes
- Clade: Angiosperms
- Clade: Eudicots
- Clade: Asterids
- Order: Asterales
- Family: Campanulaceae
- Genus: Campanula
- Species: C. alliariifolia

Binomial name
- Campanula alliariifolia Willd.

= Campanula alliariifolia =

Species of flowering plant in the bellflower family

Campanula alliariifolia is a species of flowering plant in the bellflower family Campanulaceae. It is native to the Caucasus and Turkey and it is grown as an ornamental plant. Common names include Cornish bellflower.

It is a vigorous, clump-forming perennial with heart-shaped, toothed, gray hairy basal leaves that are 3 inches (7.6 cm) long. It has tubular-bell shaped white flowers, which are 2 cm (0.8 in) long with pointed petals.

Campanula alliariifolia can grow from 12- 24 inches and spreads up to 18 inches. It is in the USDA Hardiness Zones 3–7 and can live in heat zones up to 7.
