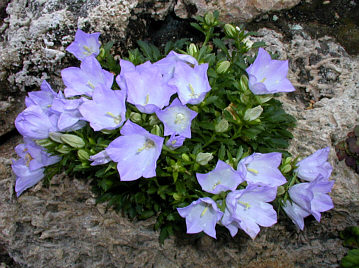

Scientific classification
- Kingdom: Plantae
- Clade: Tracheophytes
- Clade: Angiosperms
- Clade: Eudicots
- Clade: Asterids
- Order: Asterales
- Family: Campanulaceae
- Genus: Campanula
- Species: C. raineri

Binomial name
- Campanula raineri Perp.

= Campanula raineri =

Species of flowering plant

Campanula raineri (Rainer's bellflower, Rainer's harebell) is a species of flowering plant in the genus Campanula of the family Campanulaceae, native to the Swiss and Italian Alps. It is a low-growing herbaceous perennial growing 5–8 cm (2–3 in) tall by up to 20 cm (8 in) wide, with pale lilac bell-shaped flowers in summer. It is suitable for cultivation in the alpinum or rock garden. It spreads by underground runners. Its locus classicus is located in Canzo, Lombardy.

This plant has gained the Royal Horticultural Society's Award of Garden Merit.
