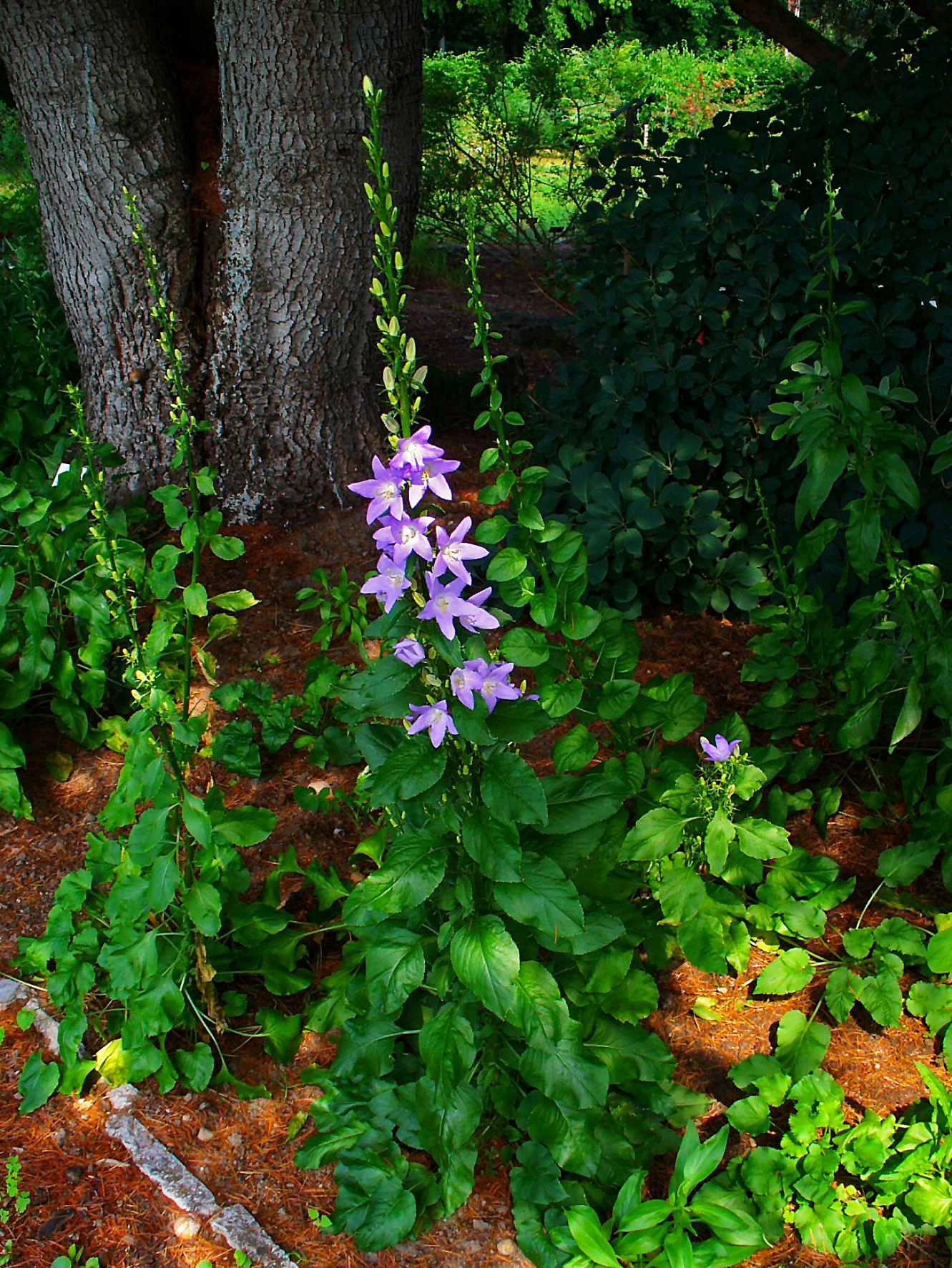

Scientific classification
- Kingdom: Plantae
- Clade: Tracheophytes
- Clade: Angiosperms
- Clade: Eudicots
- Clade: Asterids
- Order: Asterales
- Family: Campanulaceae
- Genus: Campanula
- Species: C. pyramidalis

Binomial name
- Campanula pyramidalis L.

= Campanula pyramidalis =

Species of flowering plant

Campanula pyramidalis, the chimney bellflower, is a species of Campanula, native to southeastern Europe in Italy and the western Balkans. Campanula means "bell-like" referring to the bell-shape of its flowers, while pyramidalis means pyramidal or conical, which refers to its conical shape.

It is a short-lived perennial herbaceous plant growing up to 1.5 m tall. The leaves are broad ovate on the lower part of the stem, slender lanceolate on the upper part of the stem. The flowers are bell-shaped, blue, 3–4 cm diameter. The flowers are hermaphroditic, and the plant is self-fertile. It grows in many different soil types, and can handle a wide pH range. It prefers a sunny or partially shaded area.

It is grown as an ornamental plant for its scented flowers; several cultivars have been selected with flower colour ranging from white to dark blue.

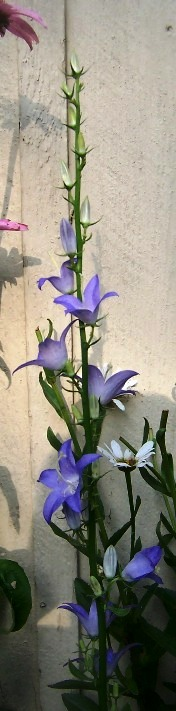
Campanula pyramidalis in flower
