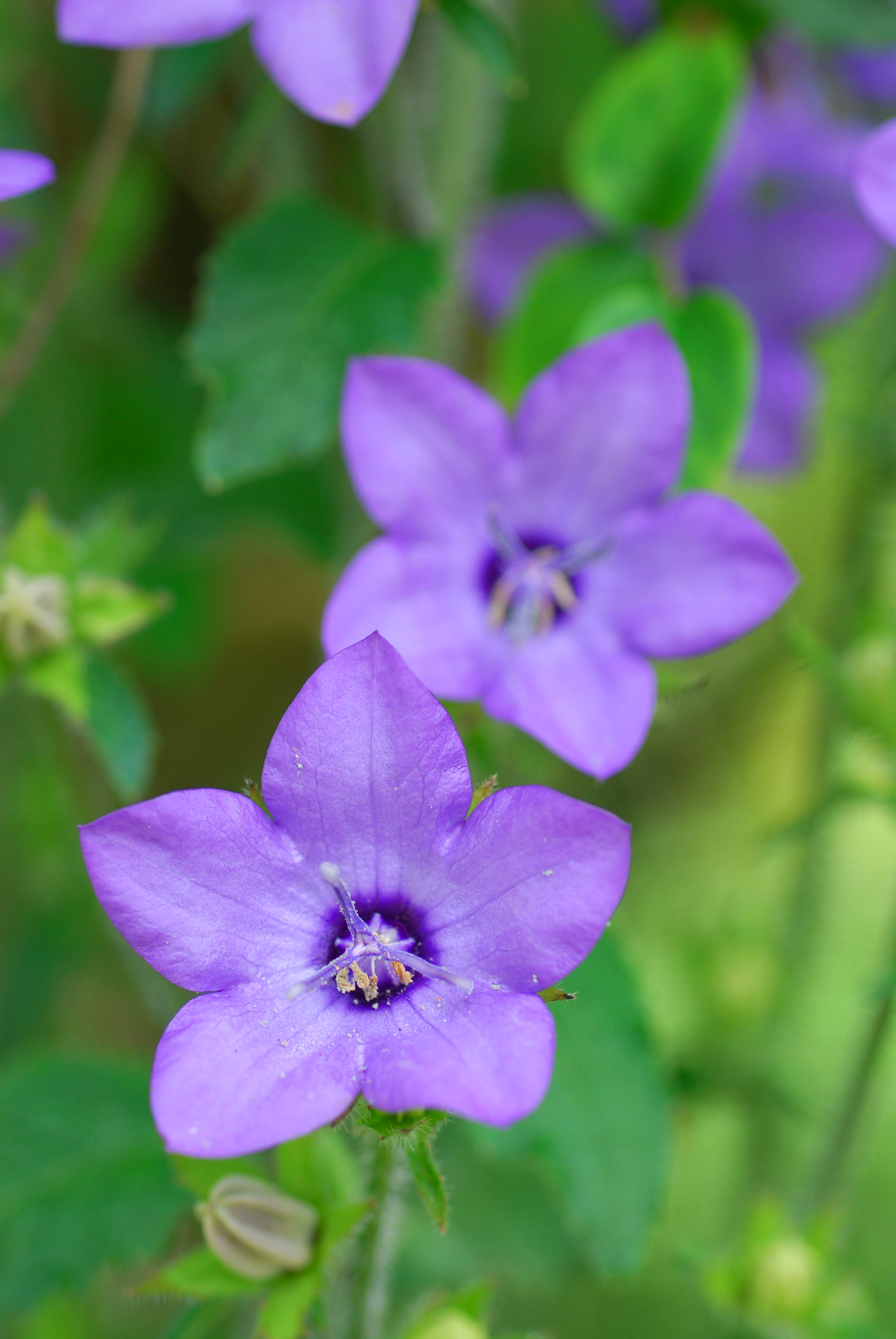

Scientific classification
- Kingdom: Plantae
- Clade: Embryophytes
- Clade: Tracheophytes
- Clade: Angiosperms
- Clade: Eudicots
- Clade: Asterids
- Order: Asterales
- Family: Campanulaceae
- Genus: Campanula
- Species: C. primulifolia

Binomial name
- Campanula primulifolia Brot.

= Campanula primulifolia =

Species of flowering plant

Campanula primulifolia is a plant species of the genus Campanula. It is native to Portugal and Spain.
