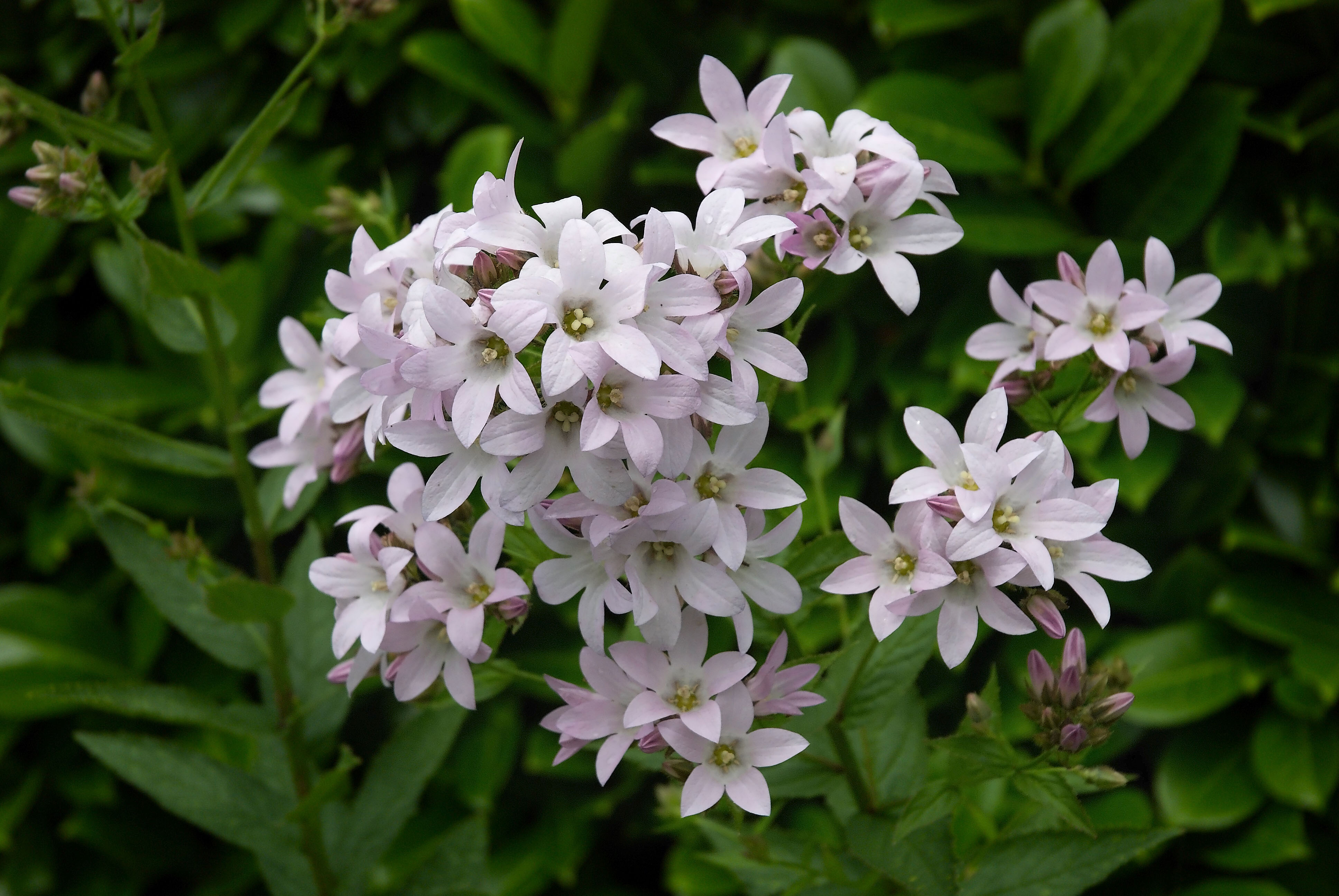
- C. lactiflora 'Loddon Anna'

Scientific classification
- Kingdom: Plantae
- Clade: Tracheophytes
- Clade: Angiosperms
- Clade: Eudicots
- Clade: Asterids
- Order: Asterales
- Family: Campanulaceae
- Genus: Campanula
- Species: C. lactiflora

Binomial name
- Campanula lactiflora M.Bieb

= Campanula lactiflora =

Species of flowering plant

Campanula lactiflora, the milky bellflower, is a species of flowering plant in the genus Campanula of the family Campanulaceae, native to Turkey and the Caucasus. It is a medium-sized herbaceous perennial growing to 1.2 m (3 ft 11 in), with narrow, toothed leaves 5–12 cm (2–5 in) long. Large conical clusters of open, star-shaped flowers are produced on branching stems in summer. In favourable conditions it will self-seed with variable results. The flowers are usually white or pale blue, but numerous cultivars have been developed for garden use, in a range of colours.

The Latin specific epithet lactiflora means "milk-white flowers".

The following cultivars have gained the Royal Horticultural Society's Award of Garden Merit:-

- 'Alba' (white)
- 'Favourite' (lilac)
- 'Loddon Anna' (pale pink)
- 'Prichard's Variety' (violet blue)
