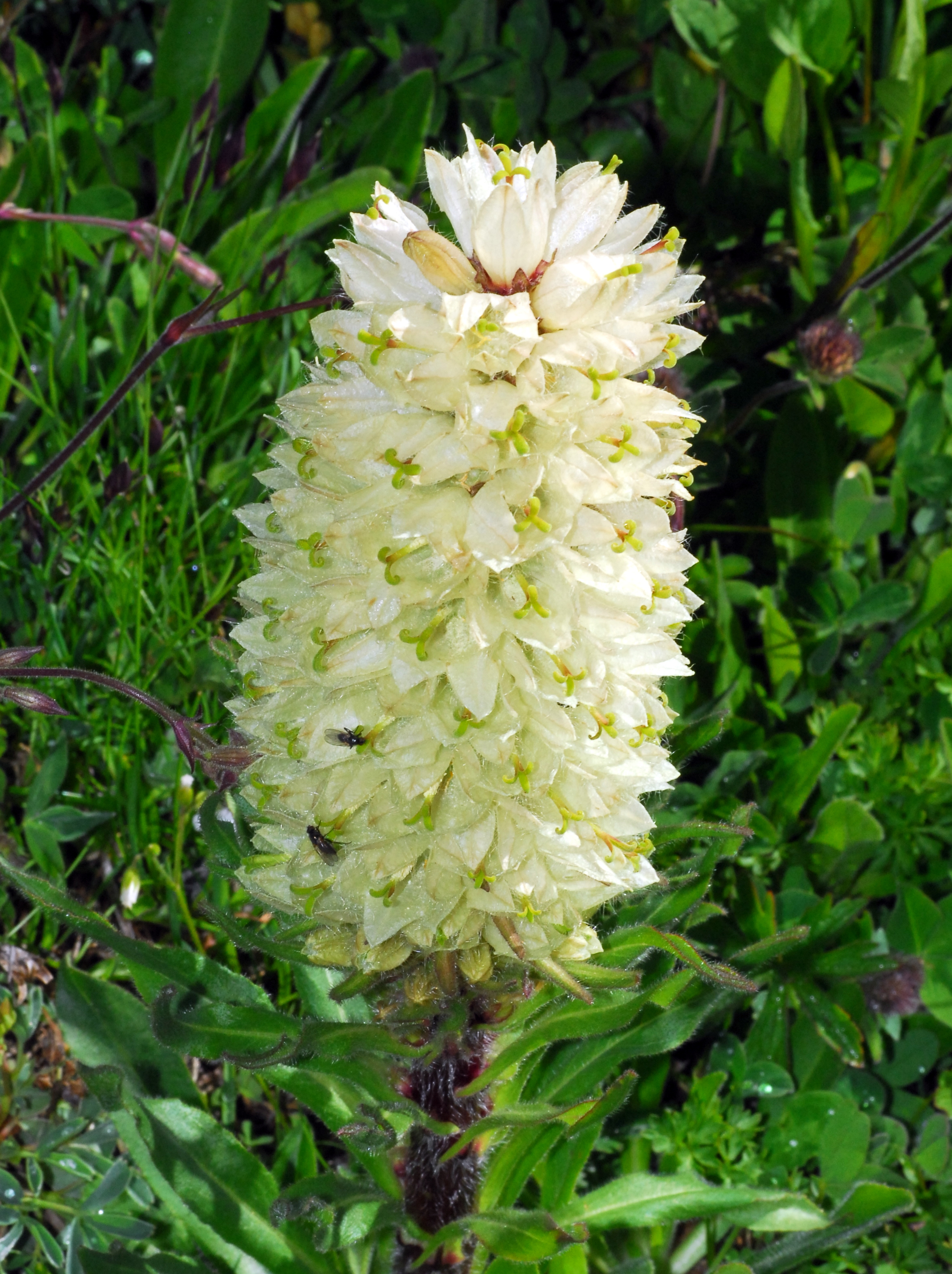
- Inflorescence of Campanula thyrsoides

Scientific classification
- Kingdom: Plantae
- Clade: Tracheophytes
- Clade: Angiosperms
- Clade: Eudicots
- Clade: Asterids
- Order: Asterales
- Family: Campanulaceae
- Genus: Campanula
- Species: C. thyrsoides

Binomial name
- Campanula thyrsoides L., 1753

Synonyms
- List: Campanula macrorhiza var. thyrsoides (L.) Vuk.; Campanula thyrsoides var. glomerata Saut.; Campanula thyrsoides var. multicaulis A.DC.; Campanula thyrsoides subsp. thyrsoides

= Campanula thyrsoides =

Species of flowering plant

Campanula thyrsoides is a flowering plant belonging to the family Campanulaceae.

== Etymology ==
The species name “thyrsoides” derives from the Latin "thyrsus" (a staff of giant fennel covered with ivy vines and leaves and associated with Dionysus) and refers to the shape of the upright inflorescence of this plant, similar to a panicle with several flowers on opposite pedicels.

== Subspecies ==
Subspecies include:

- Campanula thyrsoides thyrsoides
- Campanula thyrsoides carniolica

== Distribution and habitat ==
This species is widespread in the Alps, in the Jura Mountains and in the Balkans (Austria, Germany, Switzerland, Bosnia and Herzegovina, Bulgaria, Croatia, northern Italy, Serbia, Slovenia and France).

These plants occurs in limestone alpine lawns on the alpine or subalpine level, generally from 1500 to 2600 meters of altitude, but sometimes from 1000 meters.

== Description ==
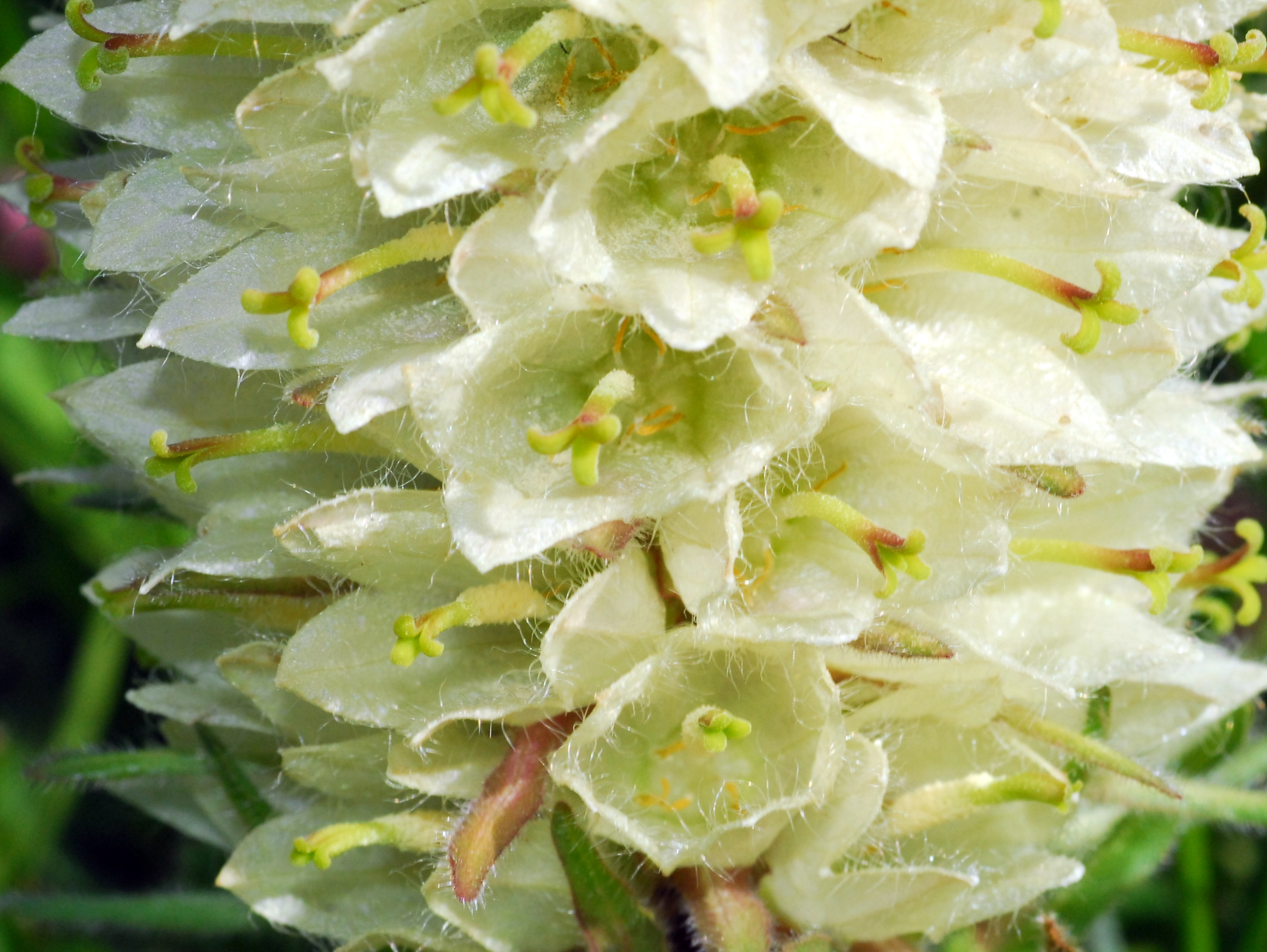
Close-up on flowers of Campanula thyrsoides

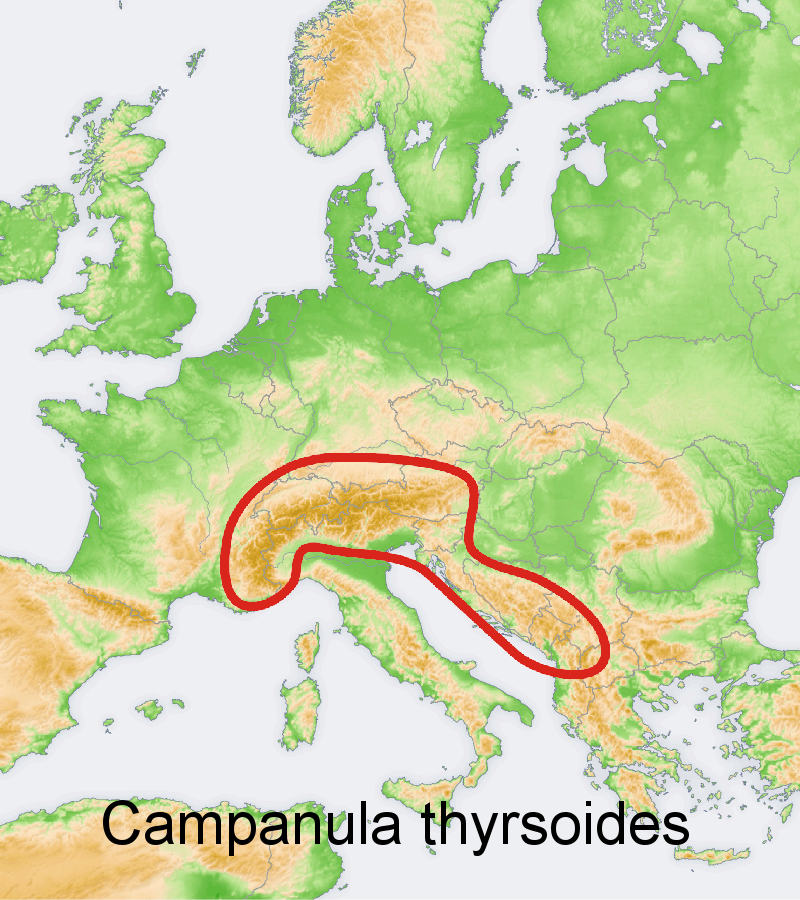
Distribution Map

Campanula thyrsoides reaches approximately 70–100 cm (28–39 in) in height. It is a herbaceous erect and perennial flowering plant with a showy dense inflorescence with up to 200 bell-shaped pale yellow flower.

The stem is densely leafed, the basal leaves are elongated lanceolate and the stem leaves are tongue-shaped.

The cycle of the plant is biennial (in the first year of life the plant completes its vegetative development, in the second it blooms and bears fruit), while the buds are placed at ground level. Flowering time generally lasts from July to August, but sometimes as early as June.

These plants are hermaphroditic. Pollination occurs through insects (entomogamous pollination) or it is autogamous. Each capsule fruit contains around 120 to 180 seeds. The dissemination of seeds is barochoric.

== Bibliography ==
- Aldén, B., S. Ryman, & M. Hjertson. 2012. Svensk Kulturväxtdatabas, SKUD (Swedish Cultivated and Utility Plants Database; online resource) URL: www.skud.info
- Crook, C. H. 1951. Campanulas: their cultivation and classification.
- Davis, P. H., ed. 1965–1988. Flora of Turkey and the east Aegean islands.
- Huxley, A., ed. 1992. The new Royal Horticultural Society dictionary of gardening
- Jovanovic, S. 1970–1977. Flora SR Srbije.
- Kadereit J.W. & Jeffrey C., The Families and Genera of Vascular Plants, Volume VIII. Asterales. Pag 41, Berlin, Heidelberg, 2007.
- Kovačić, S. 2004. The genus Campanula L. (Campanulaceae) in Croatia, circum-Adriatic and west Balkan region. Acta Bot. Croat. 63:184.
- Lewis, P. & M. Lynch. 1998. Campanulas: a gardener's guide 154.
- Sandro Pignatti, Flora d'Italia. Vol. 2, Bologna, Edagricole, 1982, pg. 691, ISBN 88-506-2449-2.
- Tutin, T. G. et al., eds. 1964–1980. Flora europaea.
- Wolfgang Lippert Dieter Podlech, Fiori, TN Tuttonatura, 1980.
