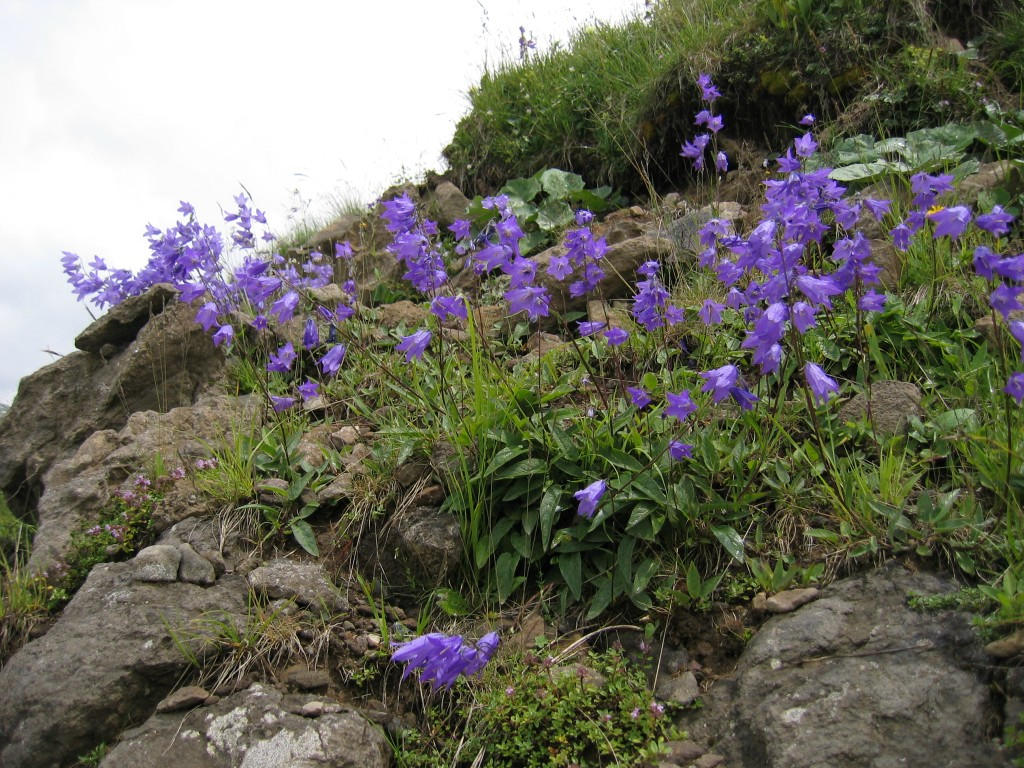

Scientific classification
- Kingdom: Plantae
- Clade: Tracheophytes
- Clade: Angiosperms
- Clade: Eudicots
- Clade: Asterids
- Order: Asterales
- Family: Campanulaceae
- Genus: Campanula
- Species: C. collina

Binomial name
- Campanula collina Sims

= Campanula collina =

Species of flowering plant in the bellflower family

Campanula collina, common name blue dwarf bellflower, is a species of flowering plant in the bellflower family Campanulaceae, native to the Caucasus and north-eastern Turkey.
