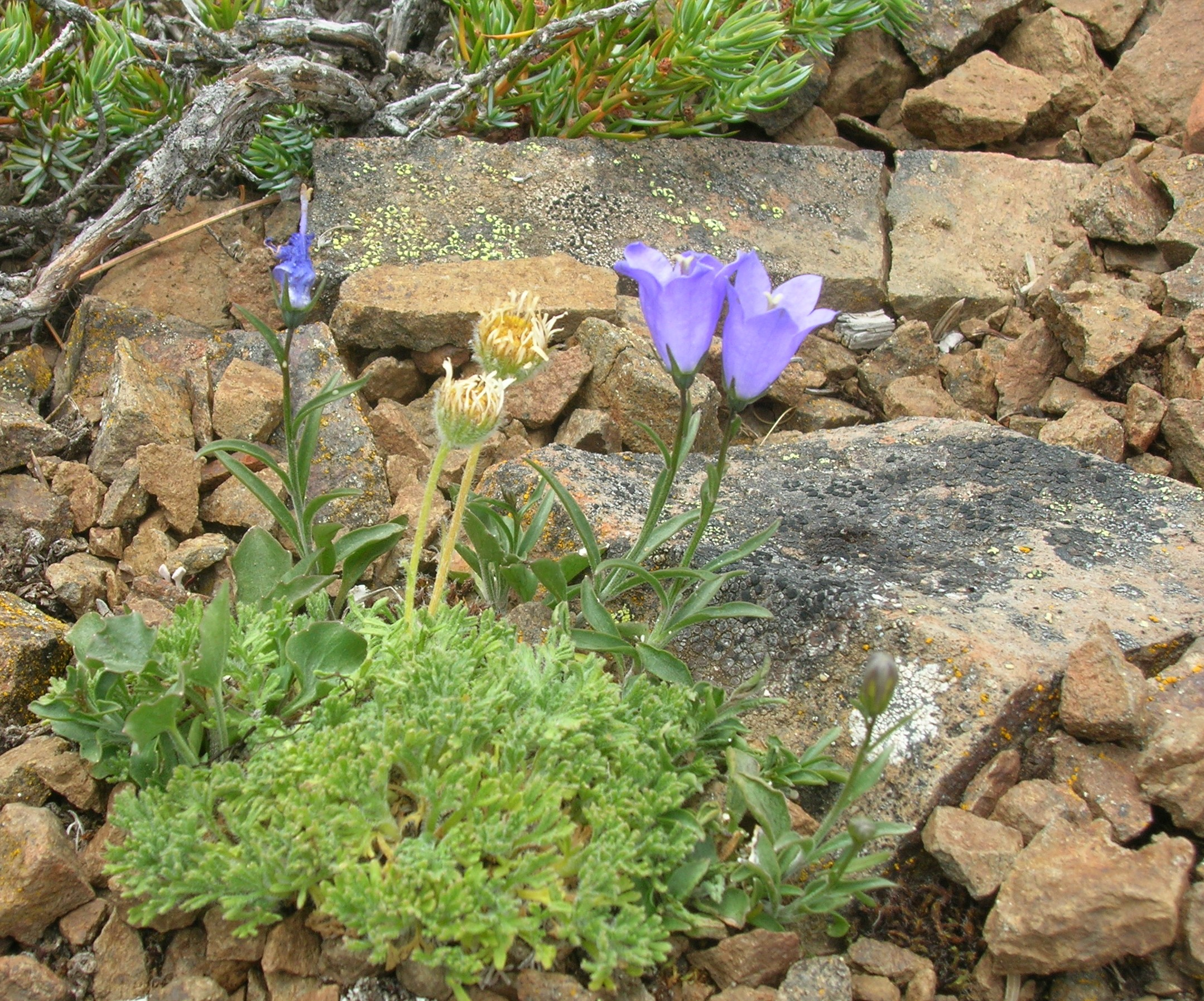

Scientific classification
- Kingdom: Plantae
- Clade: Tracheophytes
- Clade: Angiosperms
- Clade: Eudicots
- Clade: Asterids
- Order: Asterales
- Family: Campanulaceae
- Genus: Campanula
- Species: C. scabrella

Binomial name
- Campanula scabrella Engelm.

= Campanula scabrella =

Species of flowering plant

Campanula scabrella is a species of bellflower known by the common name rough bellflower. It is native to the mountains of the western United States, where it grows in talus and other rocky alpine habitat. This is a tough perennial herb growing in a clump from a woody rhizome and rarely exceeding 5 centimeters in height. The stiff leaves are linear to narrowly oval in shape and about 3 centimeters long, borne on winged petioles. The leaves are covered with very short appressed pale hairs. The small funnel-shaped flower is just under a centimeter long and pale blue or lavender in color, arising from the leaf clump on an erect pedicel about a centimeter tall.

== Range and Habitat ==
Campanula scabrella is present in three known disjunct ranges: a core range in the mountains of central Idaho and western Montana, the Cascade Mountains of Washington, and in northern California on and around Mount Shasta and Mount Lassen. It grows in scree and talus on or near mountain tops and ridges.

== Gallery ==
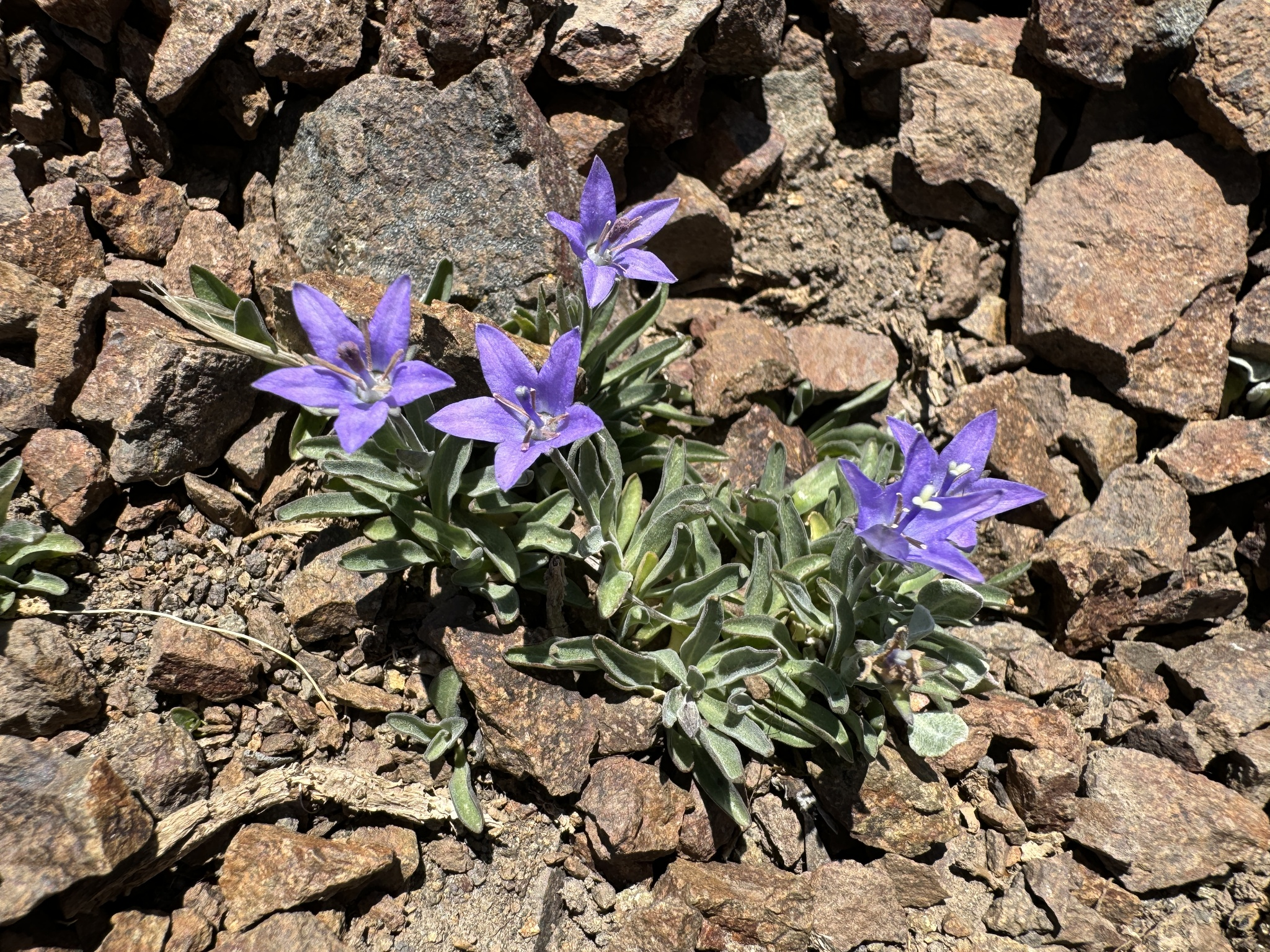
Burnt Mountain
