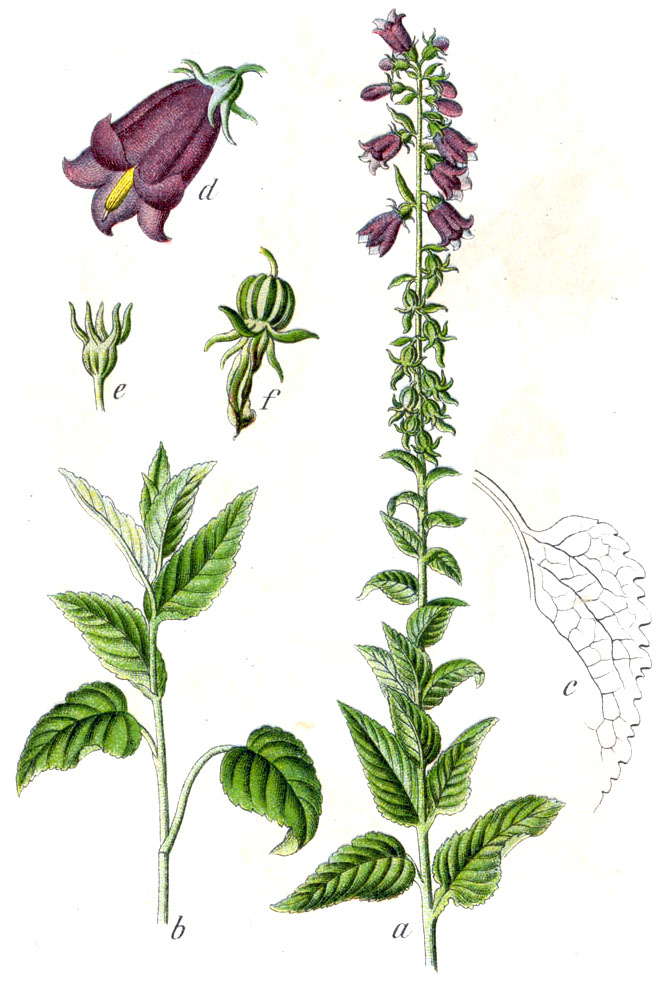

Scientific classification
- Kingdom: Plantae
- Clade: Tracheophytes
- Clade: Angiosperms
- Clade: Eudicots
- Clade: Asterids
- Order: Asterales
- Family: Campanulaceae
- Genus: Campanula
- Species: C. bononiensis

Binomial name
- Campanula bononiensis L.

= Campanula bononiensis =

Species of flowering plant

Campanula bononiensis is a species of flowering plant belonging to the family Campanulaceae.

Its native range is France to Kazakhstan.
