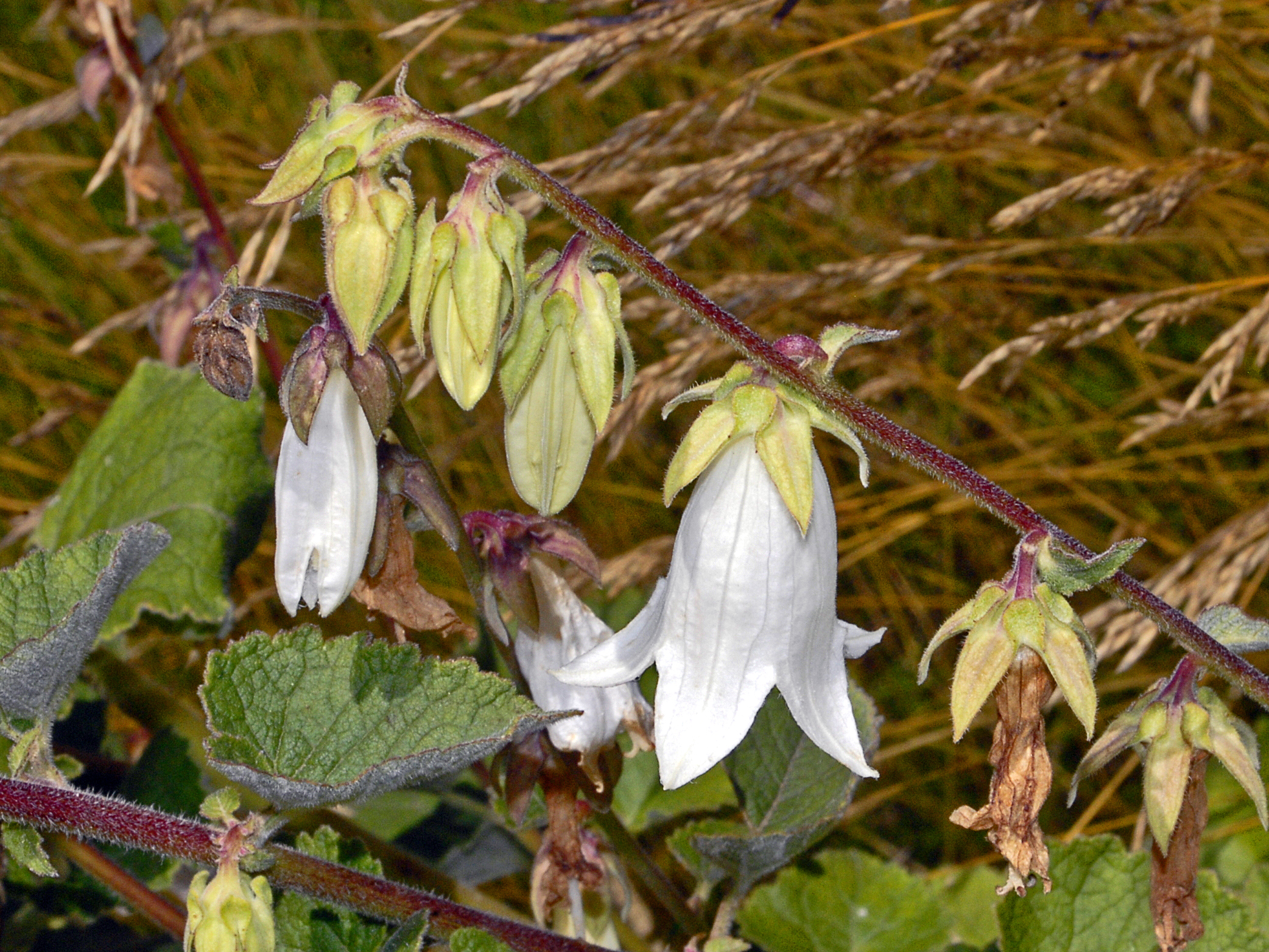
- Campanula lanata at the Paradisia Alpine Botanical Garden

Conservation status
- Data Deficient (IUCN 3.1)

Scientific classification
- Kingdom: Plantae
- Clade: Tracheophytes
- Clade: Angiosperms
- Clade: Eudicots
- Clade: Asterids
- Order: Asterales
- Family: Campanulaceae
- Genus: Campanula
- Species: C. lanata

Binomial name
- Campanula lanata Friv.

= Campanula lanata =

Species of flowering plant

Campanula lanata, the woolly bellflower, is a biennial herb belonging to the family Campanulaceae.

== Description ==
This plant has erect racemes 30–60 centimetres (12–24 in) tall, simple, alternate, serrated leaves and white or yellow bell-shaped flowers 2.5 cm long with five petals. It is very hairy (hence the common name).

== Distribution ==
Campanula lanata is endemic to Serbia and west and central Bulgaria. This species prefers meadows, fields, rocky and shady areas at an elevation of 600–1,500 metres (2,000–4,900 ft) above sea level.
