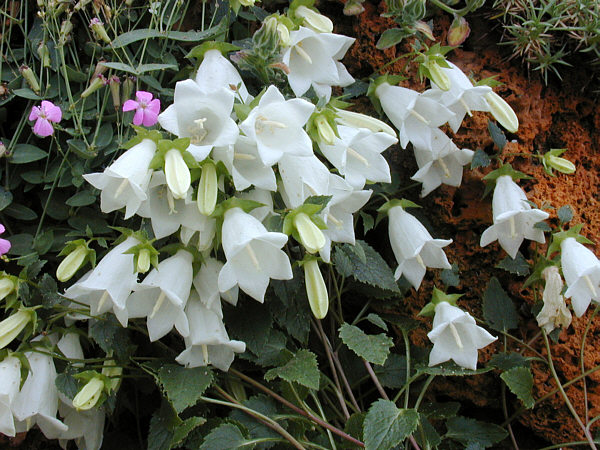

Scientific classification
- Kingdom: Plantae
- Clade: Tracheophytes
- Clade: Angiosperms
- Clade: Eudicots
- Clade: Asterids
- Order: Asterales
- Family: Campanulaceae
- Genus: Campanula
- Species: C. betulifolia

Binomial name
- Campanula betulifolia K.Koch

Synonyms
- Campanula betulifolia var. exappendiculata Albov; Campanula denticulata Boiss. & A.Huet; Campanula finitima Fomin; Symphyandra finitima (Fomin) Fomin

= Campanula betulifolia =

Species of flowering plant in the bellflower family

Campanula betulifolia, the birch-leaved bellflower, is a flowering plant in the family Campanulaceae. It is native to Turkey, where it grows in crevices in volcanic cliffs. The plant was named in 1850 by the German botanist Karl Koch, following plant-collecting expeditions to the Caucasus.

A small clump-forming herbaceous perennial growing to 10 cm (3.9 in) tall by 50 cm (20 in) wide, it has dark green birch-like leaves. In late Spring, clusters of narrow pink buds open to white bell-shaped flowers. There is also a pink-flowered form. As it has a cascading habit and requires sharp drainage it is suitable for planting in an elevated position in a rockery or alpine garden.

In cultivation in the UK this plant was accorded the Royal Horticultural Society's Award of Garden Merit in 1993.
