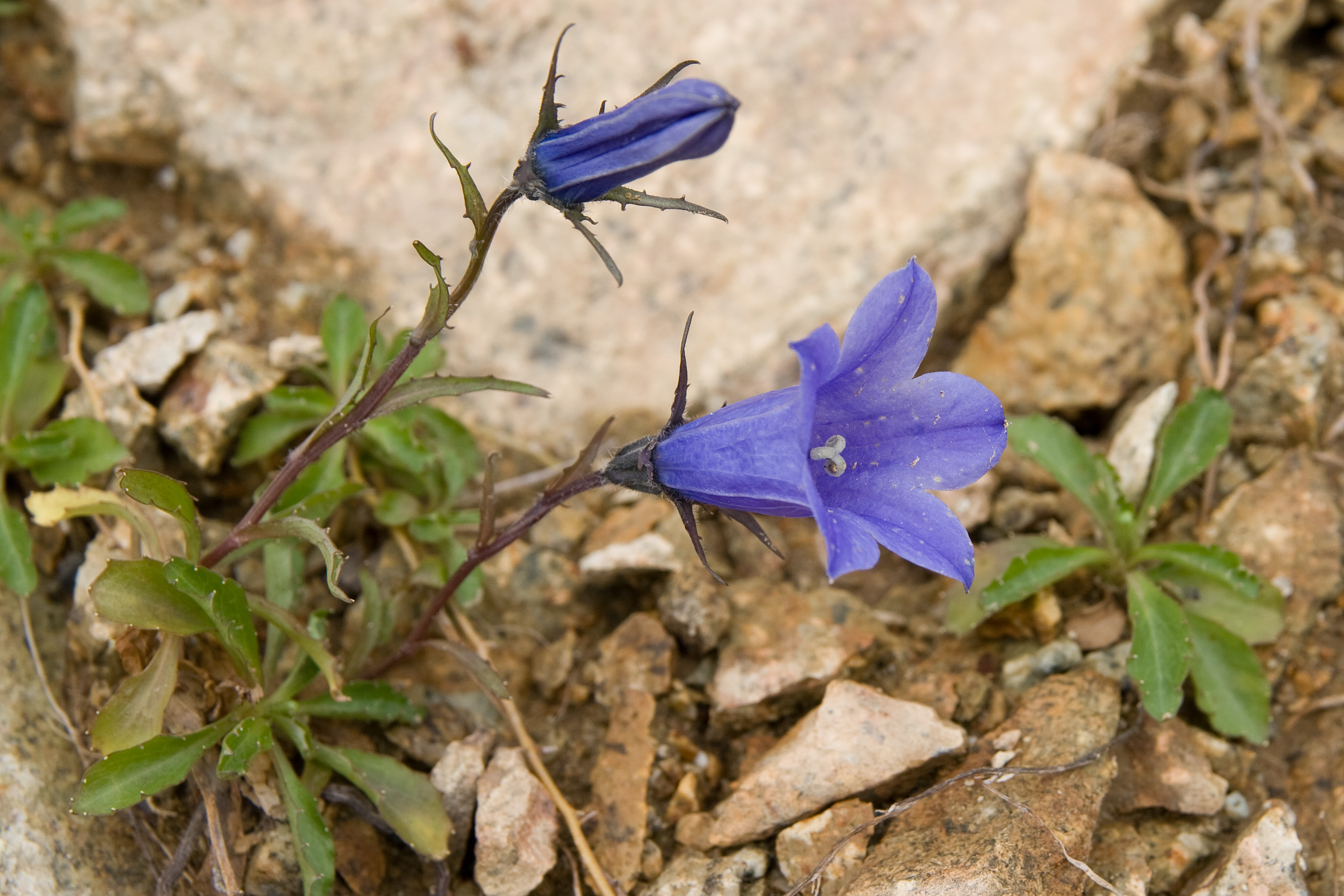

Scientific classification
- Kingdom: Plantae
- Clade: Embryophytes
- Clade: Tracheophytes
- Clade: Angiosperms
- Clade: Eudicots
- Clade: Asterids
- Order: Asterales
- Family: Campanulaceae
- Genus: Campanula
- Species: C. lasiocarpa

Binomial name
- Campanula lasiocarpa Cham.

= Campanula lasiocarpa =

Species of flowering plant

Campanula lasiocarpa, also known as the mountain harebell or Alaska harebell, is a species of flowering plant. It is native to eastern Russia, Japan, the northwestern portion of North America including the US states of Alaska and Washington, as well as the Canadian provinces of Alberta, British Columbia, the Northwest Territories, and the Yukon.
