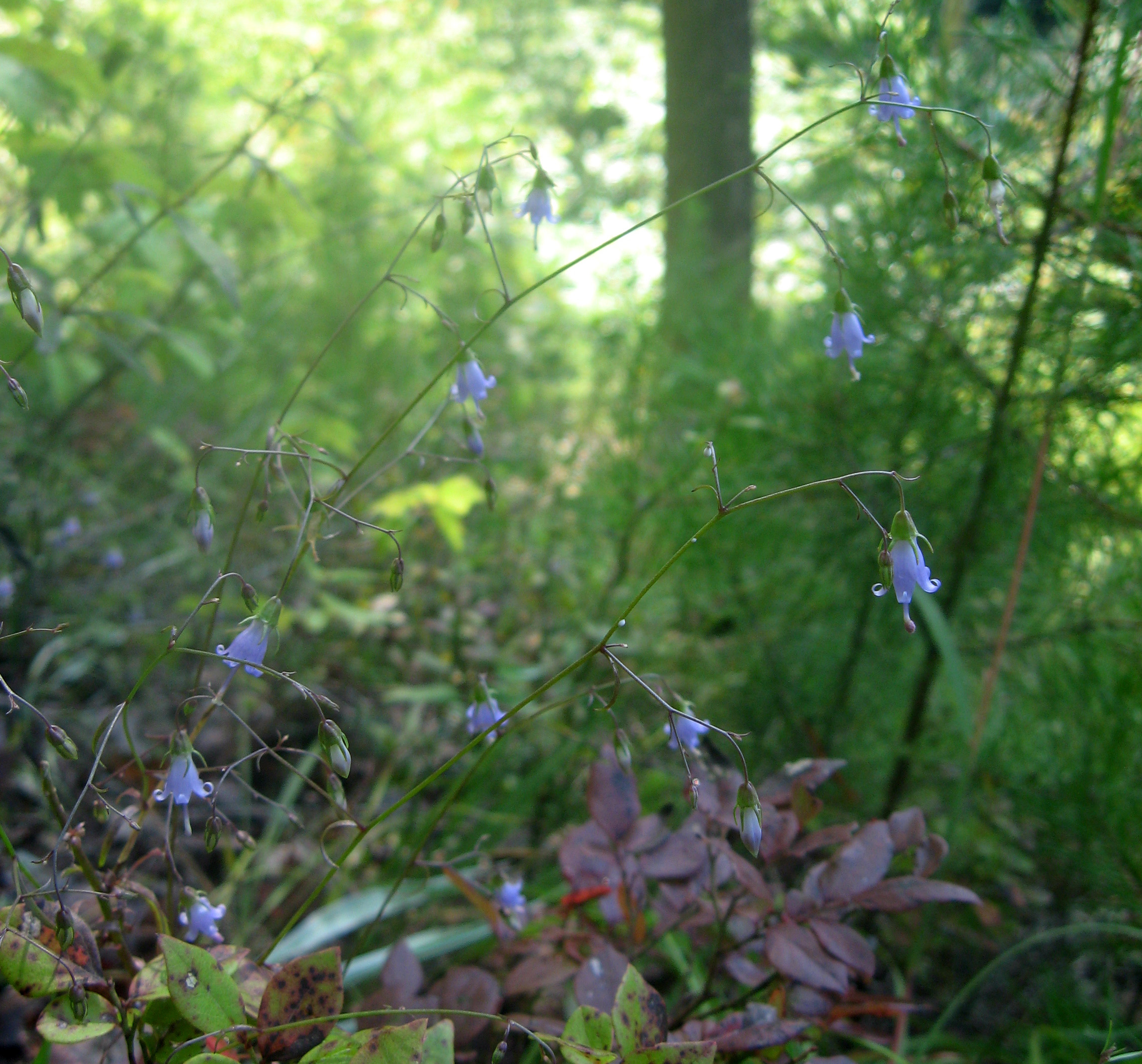

Scientific classification
- Kingdom: Plantae
- Clade: Embryophytes
- Clade: Tracheophytes
- Clade: Angiosperms
- Clade: Eudicots
- Clade: Asterids
- Order: Asterales
- Family: Campanulaceae
- Genus: Campanula
- Species: C. divaricata

Binomial name
- Campanula divaricata Michx.

= Campanula divaricata =

Species of flowering plant in the bellflower family

Campanula divaricata, common name Appalachian bellflower, is a species of flowering plant in the bellflower family Campanulaceae. It is native to the eastern United States where it is found primarily in the Appalachian Mountains. Its habitat is areas of rock outcrops such as cliffs or summits, often on dry, acidic soil.

It is a perennial that produces small blue flowers in late summer.
