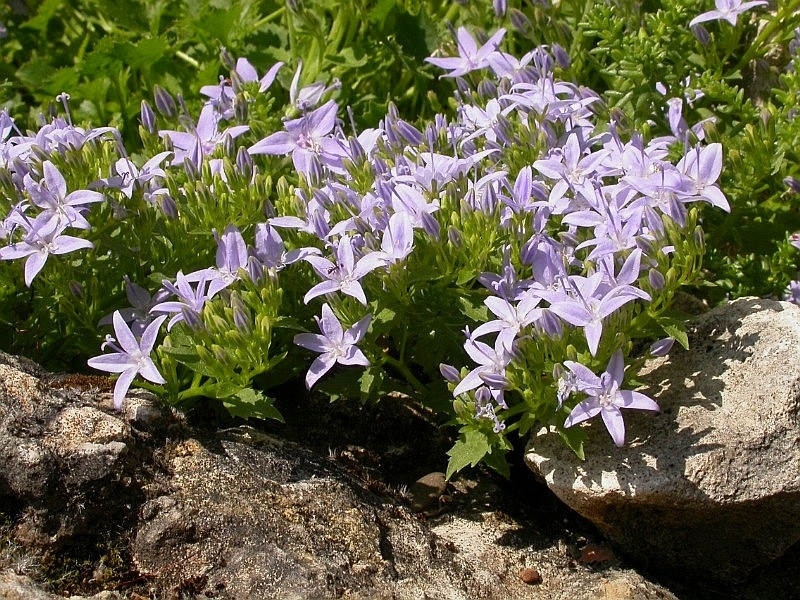

Scientific classification
- Kingdom: Plantae
- Clade: Tracheophytes
- Clade: Angiosperms
- Clade: Eudicots
- Clade: Asterids
- Order: Asterales
- Family: Campanulaceae
- Genus: Campanula
- Species: C. garganica

Binomial name
- Campanula garganica Ten.

= Campanula garganica =

Species of flowering plant in the bellflower family

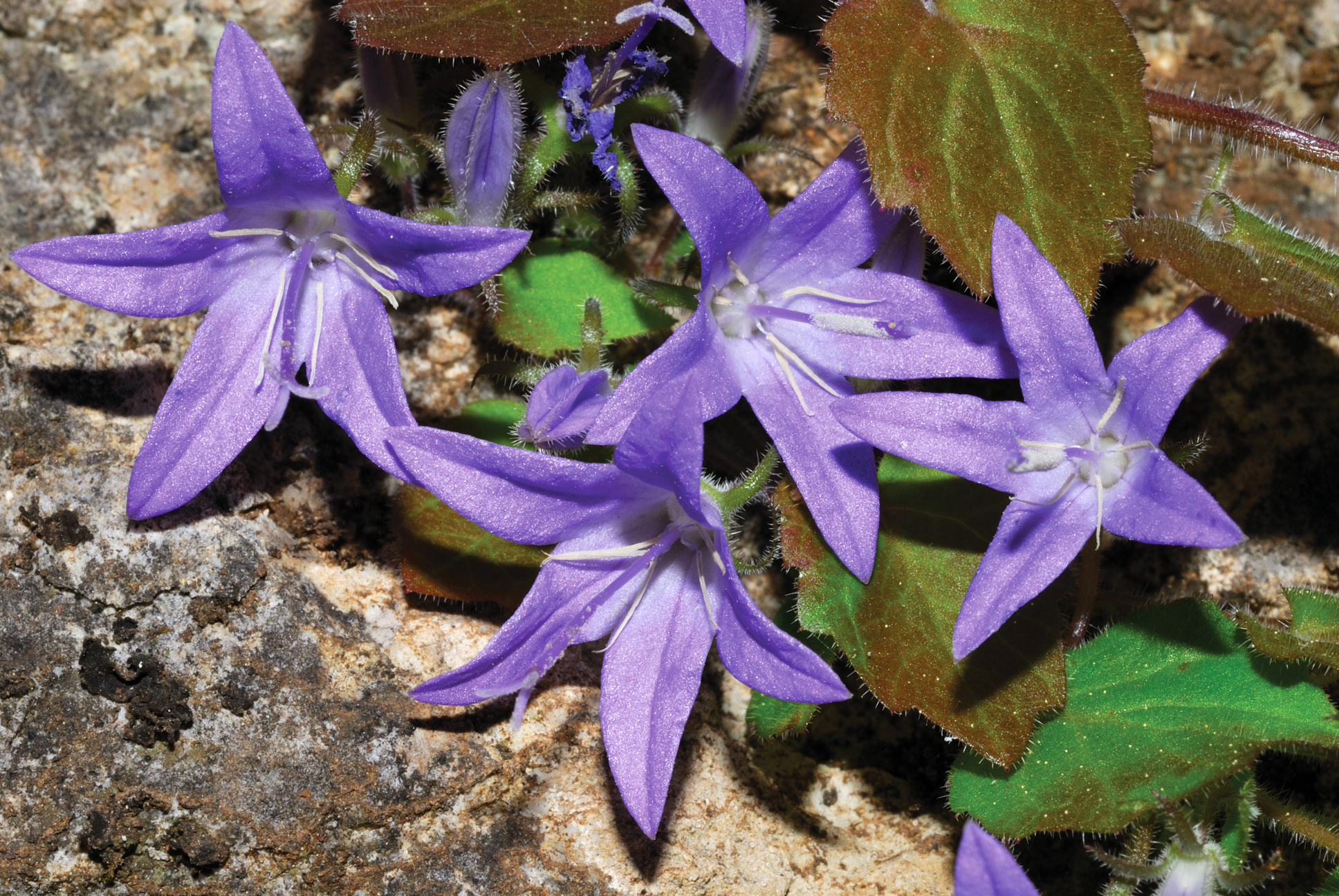
Campanula garganica ssp cephallenia

Campanula garganica, the Adriatic bellflower, syn. C. elatines var. garganica, is a species of flowering plant in the bellflower family Campanulaceae, native to Southern Europe. It is a small, spreading herbaceous perennial growing to 5 cm (2 in). Basal rosettes of leaves bear a profusion of star-shaped blue flowers in summer.

Cultivars include 'Dickson's Gold', with gold-coloured foliage, and 'W.H. Paine', with white-centred, lilac coloured flowers. The latter has gained the Royal Horticultural Society's Award of Garden Merit, along with the species.
