= Campanula aghrica =

Conservation status
- Critically Endangered (IUCN 3.1)

Scientific classification
- Kingdom: Plantae
- Clade: Embryophytes
- Clade: Tracheophytes
- Clade: Spermatophytes
- Clade: Angiosperms
- Clade: Eudicots
- Clade: Asterids
- Order: Asterales
- Family: Campanulaceae
- Genus: Campanula
- Species: C. aghrica

Binomial name
- Campanula aghrica Kit Tan & Sorger

Species of flowering plant in the bellflower family

Campanula aghrica (Turkish: Ağrı çanı), the Aghrian bellflower, is a rare flowering plant in the family Campanulaceae. It is native to Turkey and possibly Iran.

== Conservation ==
The species is listed as critically endangered by the IUCN. It is found in one area and its population is continuing to decline. It is under threat by increased urbanisation, effluents from agricultural and forestry, and livestock ranching. It occupies an area less than 10 km^{2} (3.9 sq mi). There are no conservation measures in place.
