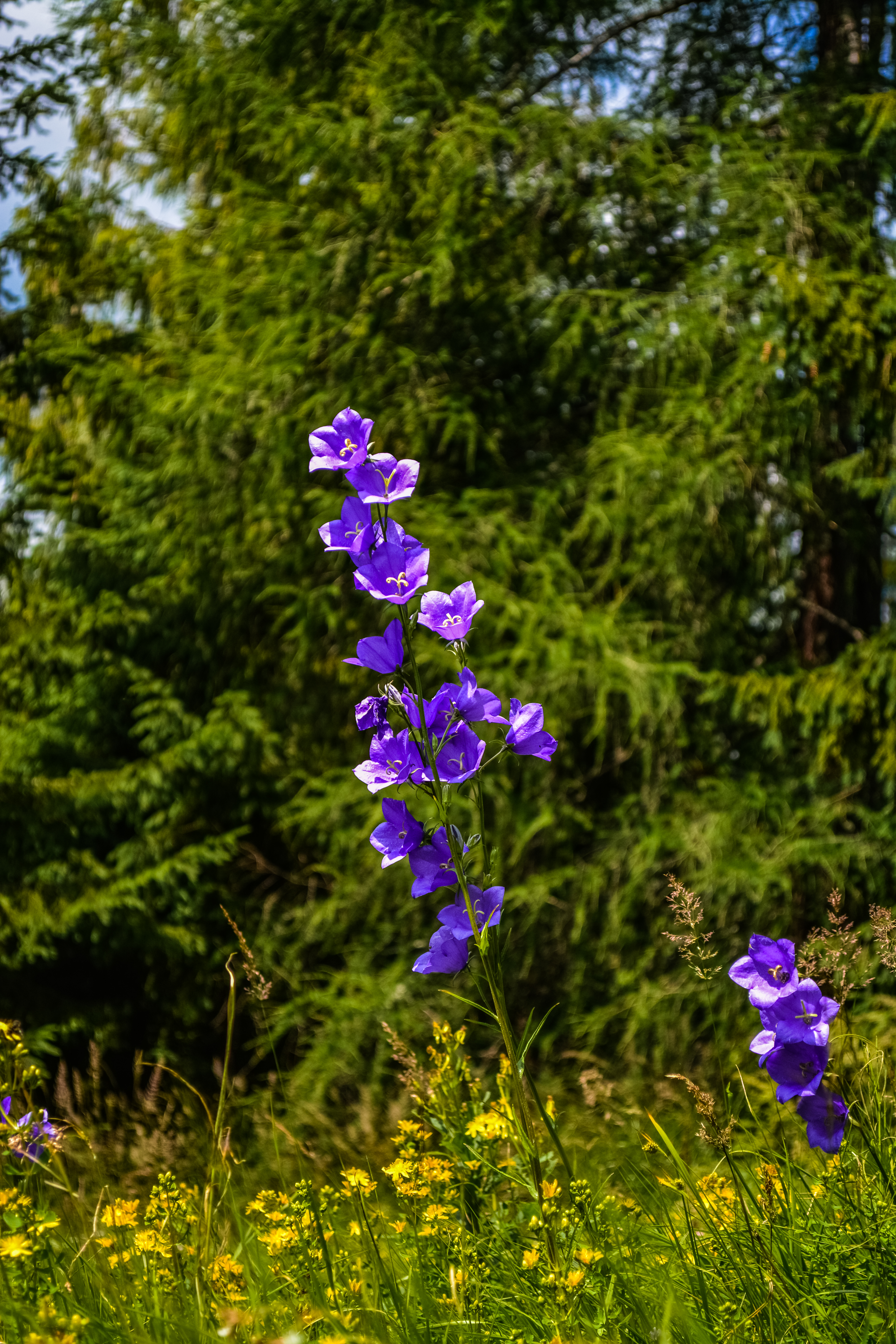
- In Slovakia

Conservation status
- Least Concern (IUCN 3.1)

Scientific classification
- Kingdom: Plantae
- Clade: Tracheophytes
- Clade: Angiosperms
- Clade: Eudicots
- Clade: Asterids
- Order: Asterales
- Family: Campanulaceae
- Genus: Campanula
- Species: C. serrata

Binomial name
- Campanula serrata (Kit. ex Schult.) Hendrych

Synonyms
- Synonymy: Campanula arcuata Schur; Campanula hornungiana Schur; Campanula kitaibeliana Schult.; Campanula lanceolata subsp. arcuata (Schur) Simonk.; Campanula lanceolata var. hornungiana (Schur) Simonk.; Campanula microphylla Kit. ex Schult.; Campanula napuligera Schur; Campanula napuligera var. alpiniformis Nyár. ex Morariu; Campanula napuligera subf. angustifrons Hruby; Campanula napuligera f. angustifrons Hruby; Campanula napuligera f. arcuata (Schur) Hruby; Campanula napuligera var. arcuata (Schur) Morariu; Campanula napuligera subf. brachyantha Hruby; Campanula napuligera var. elatior (Săvul.) Morariu; Campanula napuligera f. genuina Hruby; Campanula napuligera f. genuina Hruby; Campanula napuligera f. glabrescens Hruby; Campanula napuligera f. glabrescens Hruby; Campanula napuligera var. hirsuta Hruby; Campanula napuligera var. hornungiana (Schur) Morariu; Campanula napuligera f. humilis Hruby; Campanula napuligera f. intermedia Hruby; Campanula napuligera subf. latifrons Hruby; Campanula napuligera f. latifrons Hruby; Campanula napuligera var. longisepala Nyár.; Campanula napuligera f. longisepala (Nyár.) Morariu; Campanula napuligera f. minima (Săvul.) Morariu; Campanula napuligera f. parvula Morariu; Campanula napuligera var. redux (Schott, Nyman & Kotschy) Nyman; Campanula napuligera var. redux (Schott, Nyman & Kotschy) Hruby; Campanula napuligera f. robusta Hruby; Campanula napuligera f. savulescui Morariu; Campanula napuligera var. savulescui Morariu; Campanula napuligera var. scheuzeriformis Nyár.; Campanula napuligera f. scheuzeriformis (Nyár.) Morariu; Campanula napuligera f. semiamplexicaulis (Vladescu & Săvul.) Morariu; Campanula napuligera f. setulosa Morariu; Campanula napuligera f. simplex Hruby; Campanula napuligera var. stenophylloides (Nyár.) Morariu; Campanula napuligera f. stenophylloides Nyár.; Campanula napuligera var. stricta Hruby; Campanula napuligera subf. tenella Hruby; Campanula napuligera var. transsilvanica (Săvul.) Morariu; Campanula napuligera var. umbrosa Hruby; Campanula pseudolanceolata Pant.; Campanula pseudolanceolata f. albiflora Săvul.; Campanula pseudolanceolata var. arcuata (Schur) Porcius; Campanula pseudolanceolata f. elatior Săvul.; Campanula pseudolanceolata var. hornungiana (Schur) Porcius; Campanula pseudolanceolata f. minima Săvul.; Campanula pseudolanceolata var. porcii Săvul.; Campanula pseudolanceolata subsp. semiamplexicaulis Vladescu & Săvul.; Campanula pseudolanceolata f. transsilvanica Săvul.; Campanula pseudolanceolata f. umbraticola Săvul.; Campanula redux Schott, Nyman & Kotschy; Campanula rhomboidalis var. angustifolia Neilr.; Campanula rhomboidalis subsp. pseudolanceolata (Pant.) Nyman; Campanula rotundifolia var. alpina Schur; Campanula rotundifolia var. arcuata (Schur) Nyman; Campanula rotundifolia var. dentata Schur; Campanula rotundifolia var. grandiflora J.A.Knapp; Thesium serratum Kit. ex Schult. (1814) (basionym)

= Campanula serrata =

Species of flowering plant

Campanula serrata is a species of flowering plant in the bellflower family (Campanulaceae). It is a short and slender herbaceous rhizomatous perennial native to the Carpathians of Slovakia, Poland, Ukraine, and Romania.
