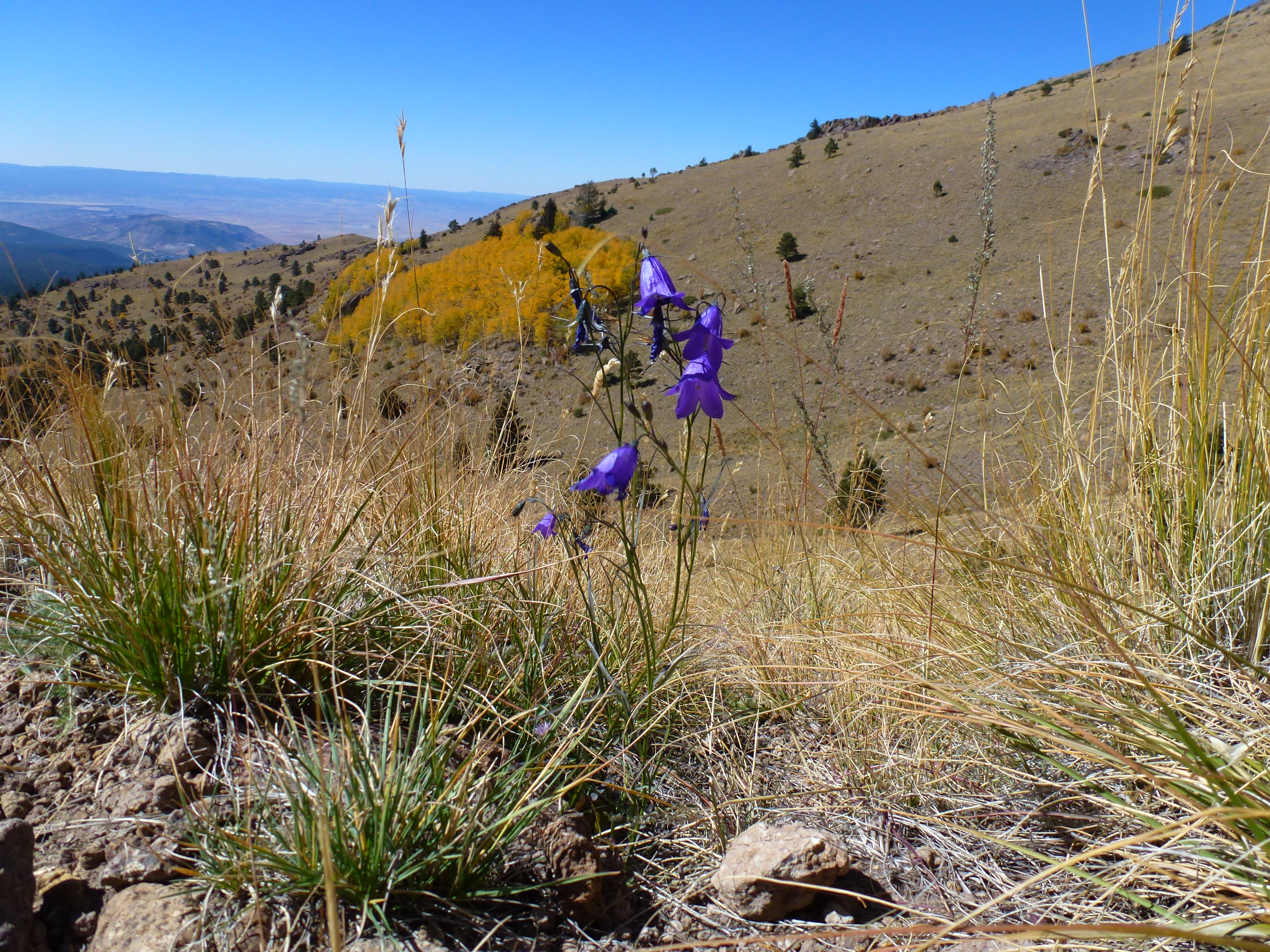

Conservation status
- Apparently Secure (NatureServe)

Scientific classification
- Kingdom: Plantae
- Clade: Tracheophytes
- Clade: Angiosperms
- Clade: Eudicots
- Clade: Asterids
- Order: Asterales
- Family: Campanulaceae
- Genus: Campanula
- Species: C. parryi

Binomial name
- Campanula parryi A.Gray

= Campanula parryi =

Species of flowering plant

Campanula parryi, or Parry's bellflower, is a summer perennial found in montane, subalpine open meadows, moist pine woodland, and sunny streambanks; across southern rocky mountain states. It is widespread, but sparse within suitable habitat. At 2-12 inches (5-30 cm) tall, C. parryi has narrow, linear leaves, thin stems, and periwinkle colored solitary flowers, which are typically upward facing. The flower has five petals fused together to create the namesake bell-shape.

== Uses ==
It is used medicinally by the Zuni people. The blossoms are chewed, and the saliva is applied to the skin as a depilatory. A poultice of chewed root is also applied to bruises.
