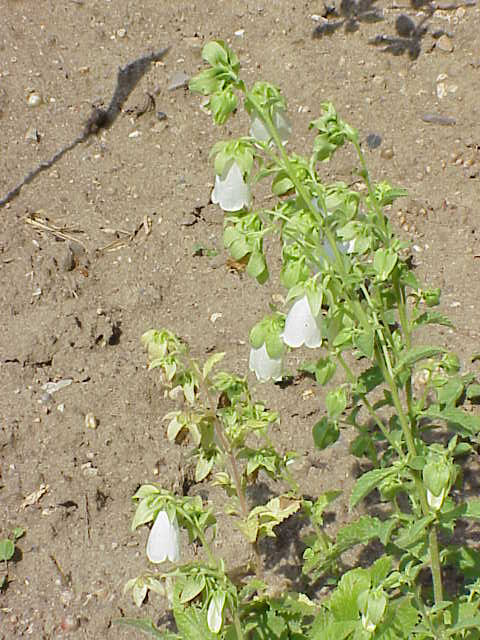

Scientific classification
- Kingdom: Plantae
- Clade: Tracheophytes
- Clade: Angiosperms
- Clade: Eudicots
- Clade: Asterids
- Order: Asterales
- Family: Campanulaceae
- Genus: Campanula
- Species: C. pendula

Binomial name
- Campanula pendula M.Bieb.

Synonyms
- Symphyandra pendula (M.Bieb.) A.DC.

= Campanula pendula =

Species of flowering plant

Campanula pendula is a species of flowering plant in the family Campanulaceae. It is native to the North Caucasus of Russia. It is a herbaceous perennial plant growing to 30–60 cm tall. The leaves are cordate to lanceolate in shape with biserrate edges. The flowers are nodding, bell-shaped, 3–5 cm long, creamy white, produced in arching panicles from early summer to early autumn.
