= Campanula balfourii =

Conservation status
- Least Concern (IUCN 3.1)

Scientific classification
- Kingdom: Plantae
- Clade: Tracheophytes
- Clade: Angiosperms
- Clade: Eudicots
- Clade: Asterids
- Order: Asterales
- Family: Campanulaceae
- Genus: Campanula
- Species: C. balfourii

Binomial name
- Campanula balfourii Wagner & Vierh.

Species of flowering plant in the bellflower family

Campanula balfourii is a species of flowering plant in the bellflower family Campanulaceae. It is endemic to northeastern Socotra, Yemen. Its natural habitat is subtropical or tropical dry forests.

== Description ==
Delicate, erect herb to 15 cm (5.9 in), with spreading hairs. Leaves broadly oblong-elliptic to orbicular, 0.5–1 x 0.3–07 cm. Flowers lilac-blue, <0.8 cm long, sessile.

== Ecology ==
Clearings in semi-deciduous woodland, 500–750 m (1,640–2,460 ft). This delicate annual with its small pretty flowers, appears soon after rain but rapidly dies back in the dry season.

== Conservation status ==
Least concern (LC). Common in several vegetation types and under no present or perceived threat.
