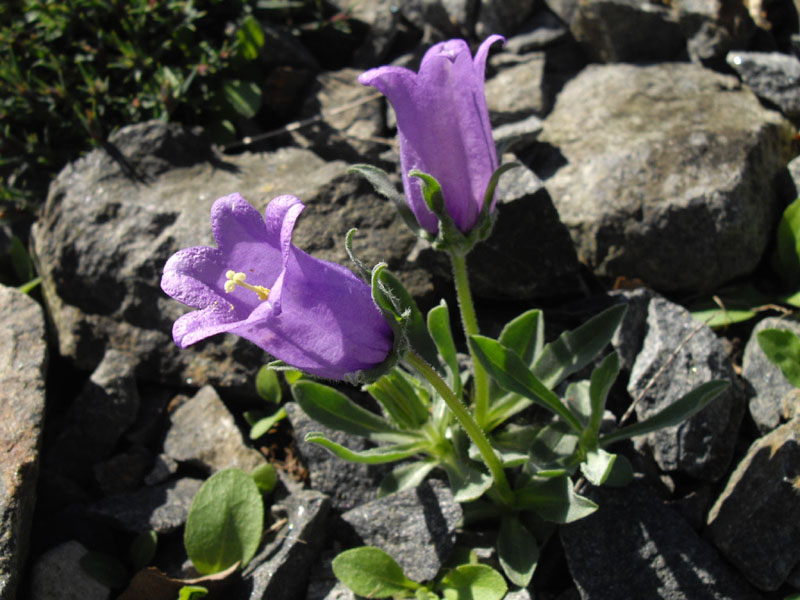

Scientific classification
- Kingdom: Plantae
- Clade: Tracheophytes
- Clade: Angiosperms
- Clade: Eudicots
- Clade: Asterids
- Order: Asterales
- Family: Campanulaceae
- Genus: Campanula
- Species: C. alpestris

Binomial name
- Campanula alpestris All., 1773

Synonyms
- Campanula allionii

= Campanula alpestris =

Species of flowering plant in the bellflower family

Campanula alpestris, the alpine bellflower, is a species of flowering plant in the family Campanulaceae. It is native to the southwestern European Alps.

The generic name (Campanula) comes from the shape of a bell flower; in particular, the word comes from Latin and means: small bell. From the records it shows that the first to use the botanical name of "Bellflower" was the Belgian naturalist Rembert Dodoens, who lived between 1517 and 1585. This name was still in use for some time, although modified, in many European languages. In fact, in these plants they were archaic French "Campanelles" calls (today we say "Campanules" or "Clochettes"), while in German are called "Glockenblumen" and in English "Bell-flower" or "Blue-bell". In Italian they are called "bells". All these forms that derive from the Latin language course. The specific name (alpestris) refers the typical habitats of these plants; in particular it refers to the lowest mountain areas where the vegetation is influenced by the foothills. The scientific name of the species was defined for the first time by the Italian botanist and physician Carlo Allioni in the publication Auctarium ad Synopsim Methodicam Stirpium Horti Reg. Taurinensis - 11 and later in Flora Pedemontana sive Enumeratio Methodica Stirpium Indigenarum Pedemontii - 113. t. 6. f. 3..
