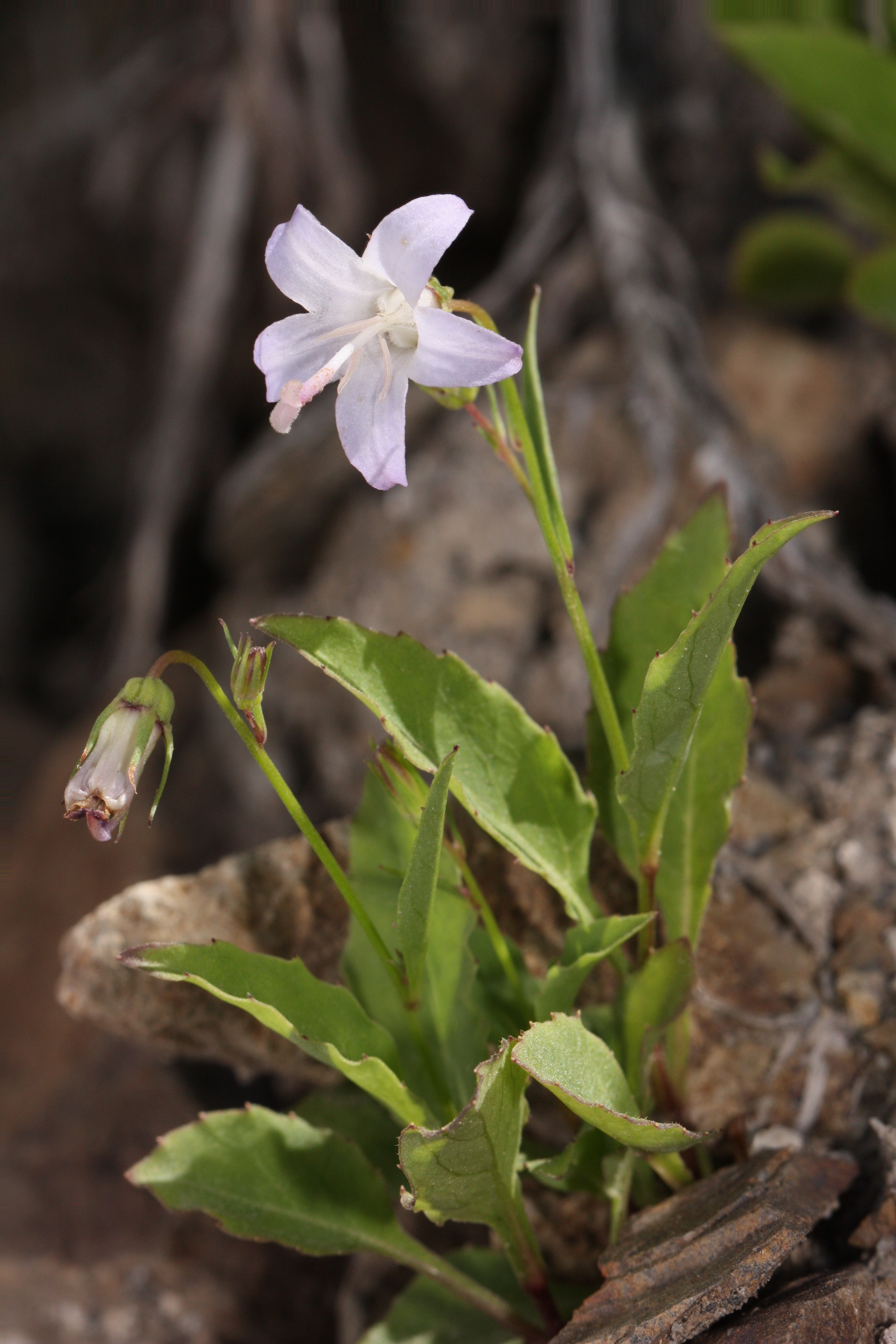

Scientific classification
- Kingdom: Plantae
- Clade: Tracheophytes
- Clade: Angiosperms
- Clade: Eudicots
- Clade: Asterids
- Order: Asterales
- Family: Campanulaceae
- Genus: Campanula
- Species: C. scouleri

Binomial name
- Campanula scouleri Hook. ex A.DC.

= Campanula scouleri =

Species of flowering plant

Campanula scouleri is a species of bellflower known by the common names pale bellflower and Scouler's harebell. It is native to the mountains of western North America from northern California to Alaska.

== Description ==
It is a rhizomatous perennial herb producing an erect or leaning stem 20 to 30 centimeters long. The leaves are thin to leathery, lance-shaped to round, and generally toothed, measuring 1 to 6 centimeters long and borne on short winged petioles. The pale blue bell-shaped flower has a strongly reflexed corolla with lobes curling back and sometimes almost touching. The style protrudes far from the center of the flower; it is white to pale blue in color and up to 1.5 centimeters long.
