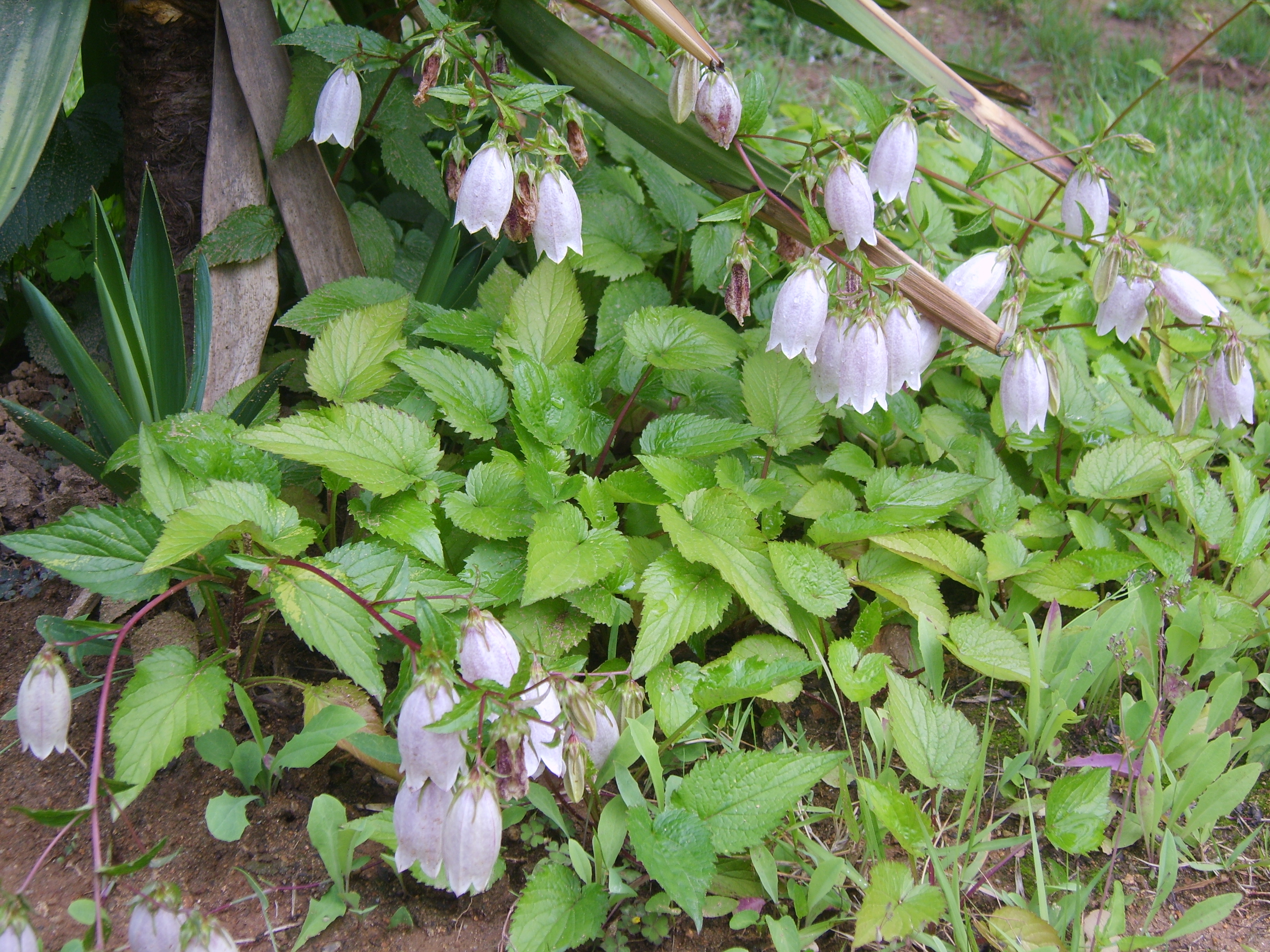

Scientific classification
- Kingdom: Plantae
- Clade: Tracheophytes
- Clade: Angiosperms
- Clade: Eudicots
- Clade: Asterids
- Order: Asterales
- Family: Campanulaceae
- Genus: Campanula
- Species: C. punctata

Binomial name
- Campanula punctata Lam. 1785

= Campanula punctata =

Species of flowering plant

Campanula punctata, the spotted bellflower, is a species of flowering plant in the bellflower family Campanulaceae. This ornamental herbaceous perennial is native to Japan, Korea, China and Siberia, and is widely cultivated for its attractive bell-shaped flowers.

The Latin specific epithet punctata means "spotted".

== Description ==
It usually grows to 30–100 cm (0.98–3.28 ft) tall and broad. It has upright stems which grow with stolons. The basal leaves are long, ovate and heart-shaped. The leaves on flowering stems are rosettes, short and ovate. They are alternate and toothed. The whole plant is covered in hairs, including flowers, stems, and leaves.

=== Flowers ===
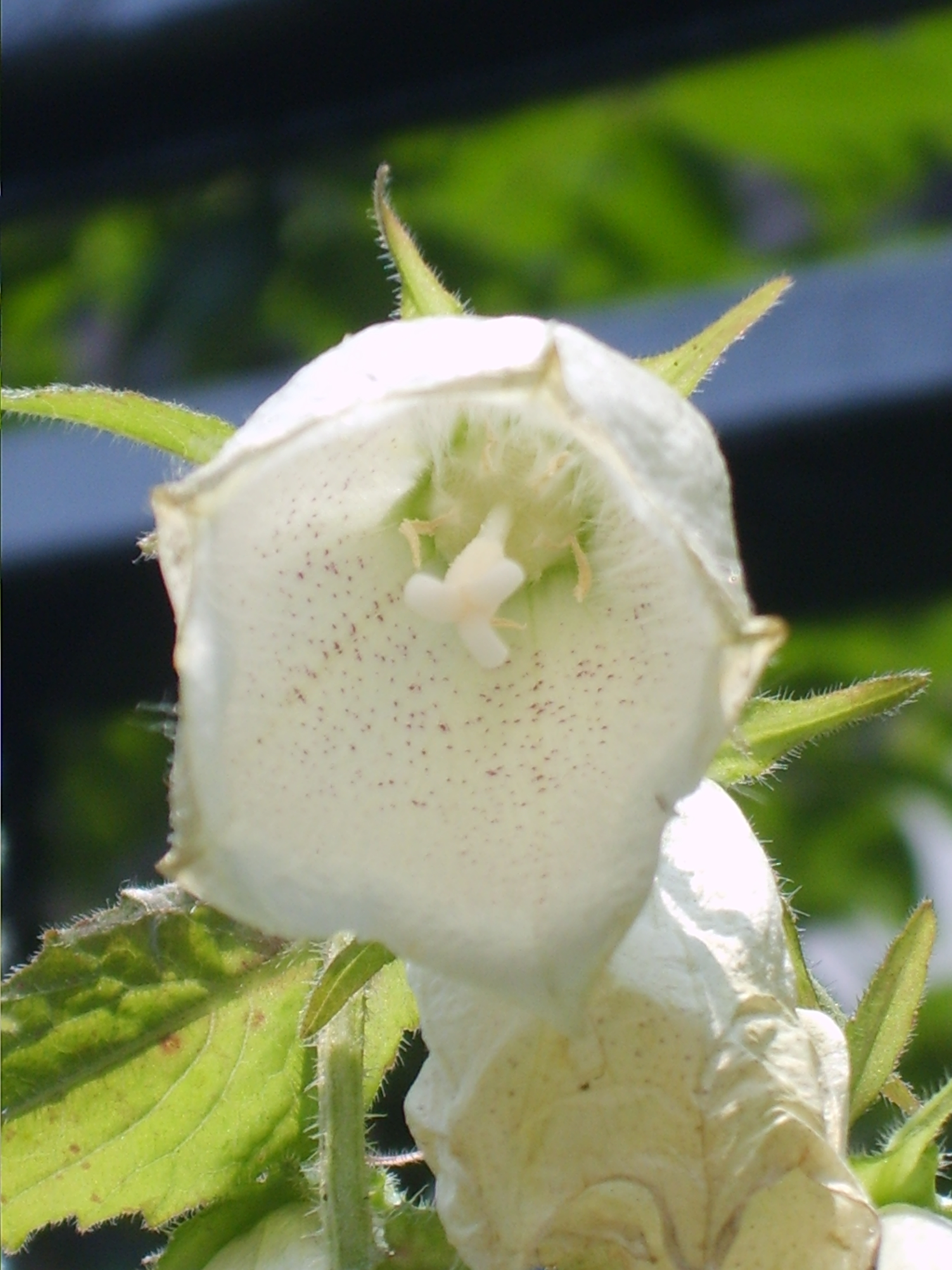

The flowers bloom from June to August. They are bell-shaped and pendent. The colors range from white to pale pink. There are red spots inside the flower along with hairs.

The flower is hermaphrodite, meaning it has both male and female organs (stamen and pistil).

== Distribution ==
Campanula punctata is found in sunny East Asian forest edges, thickets and meadows below 2300 m. In China it occurs in E Gansu, Hebei, Heilongjiang, W Henan, W Hubei, Jilin, Liaoning, Nei Mongol, Shaanxi, Shanxi, NE Sichuan. It is also widely distributed in Japan, Korea, and the far East of Russia (Siberia).

== Cultivation ==
It is valued for its highly ornamental blooms, and is widely cultivated in temperate regions of the Northern Hemisphere. Several forms and cultivars have been developed, including:

- 'Pantaloons'
- 'Pink Chimes'
- 'Wedding Bells'
- Campanula punctata f. rubriflora
- Campanula punctata f. rubriflora 'Wine 'n' Rubies'
- Campanula punctata var. takesimana (Korean bellflower)

Campanula punctata thrives in moist, alkaline or neutral soil with full to part sunlight. It is reported to be extremely hardy, tolerating temperatures of −20 °C (−4 °F) and below.
