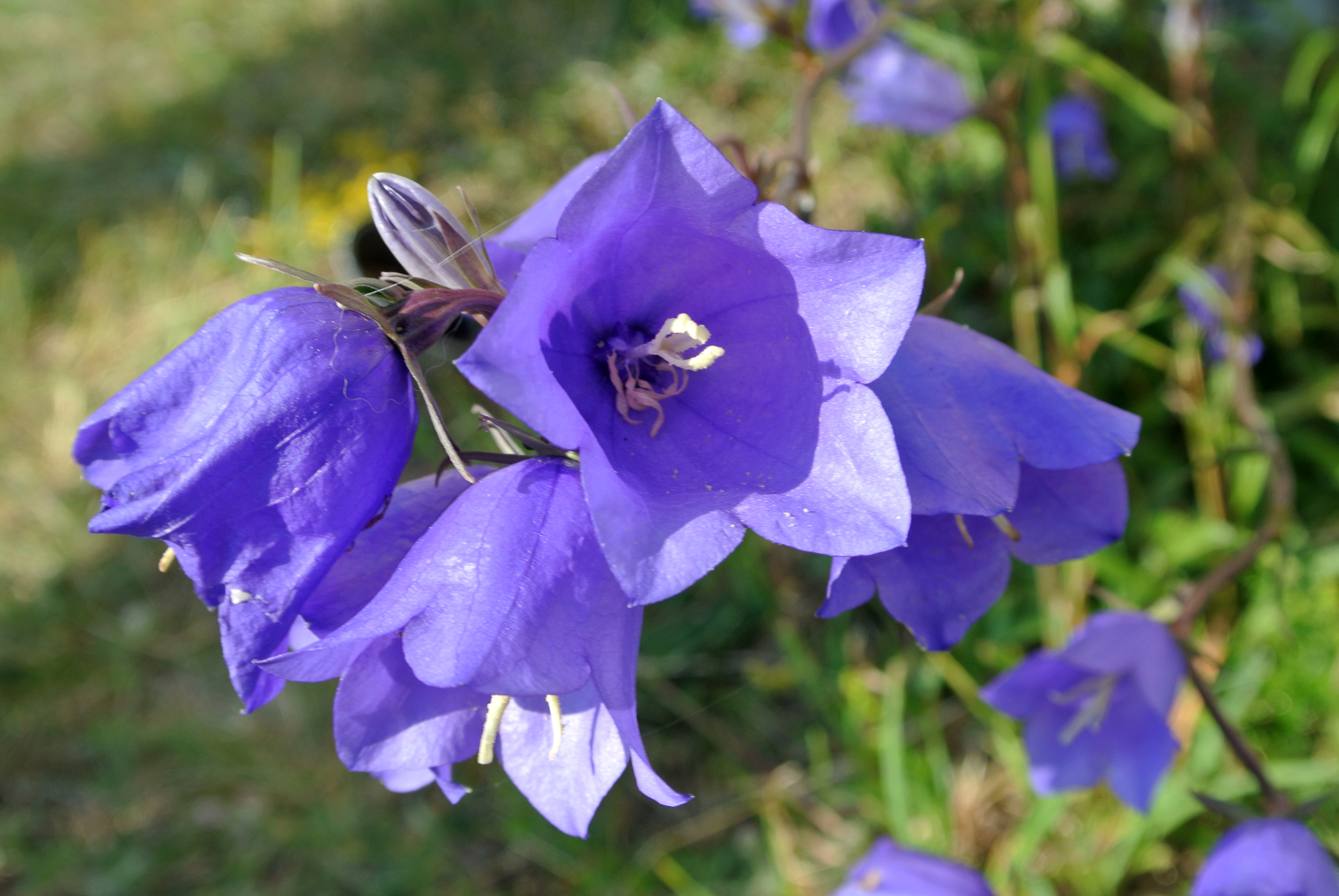
- Campanula persicifolia near Tehumardi, Saaremaa, Estonia.

Scientific classification
- Kingdom: Plantae
- Clade: Tracheophytes
- Clade: Angiosperms
- Clade: Eudicots
- Clade: Asterids
- Order: Asterales
- Family: Campanulaceae
- Subfamily: Campanuloideae
- Genus: Campanula; L.

Type species
- Campanula latifolia L.

Synonyms
- List: Annaea Kolak.; Astrocodon Fed.; Azorina Feer; Brachycodon Fed.; Brachycodonia Fed. ex Kolak.; Cenekia Opiz; Decaprisma Raf.; Depierrea Schltdl.; Diosphaera Buser; Drymocodon Fourr; Echinocodon Kolak.; Echinocodonia Kolak.; Erinia Noulet; Fedorovia Kolak.; Gadellia Schulkina; Gaertnera Retz.; Halacsyella Janch.; Hayekia Lakusic ex D.Lakusic, Shuka & Eddie; Hemisphaera Kolak.; Hyssaria Kolak.; Lacara Raf.; Loreia Raf.; Marianthemum Schrank; Medium Spach; Medium Opiz; Megalocalyx (Damboldt) Kolak.; Mzymtella Kolak.; Nenningia Opiz; Neocodon Kolak. & Serdyuk.; Pentropis Raf.; Petkovia Stef.; Popoviocodonia Fed.; Pseudocampanula Kolak.; Quinquelocularia K.Koch; Petkovia Stef.; Pseudocampanula Kolak.; Rapuntia Chevall.; Roucela Dumort; Sachokiella Kolak.; Sicyocodon Feer; Sykoraea Opiz; Symphyandra A.DC.; Syncodon Fourr.; Talanelis Raf.; Theodorovia Opiz; Trachelioides Opiz; Tracheliopsis Buser; Weitenwebera Opiz

= Campanula =

Bellflower

Genus of flowering plants

Campanula (/kæmˈpænjʊlə/) is the type genus of the Campanulaceae family of flowering plants. Campanula are commonly known as bellflowers and take both their common and scientific names from the bell-shaped flowers—campanula is Latin for "little bell".

The genus includes over 500 species and several subspecies, distributed across the temperate and subtropical regions of the Northern Hemisphere, with centers of diversity in the Mediterranean region, Balkans, Caucasus and mountains of western Asia. The range also extends into mountains in tropical regions of Asia and Africa.

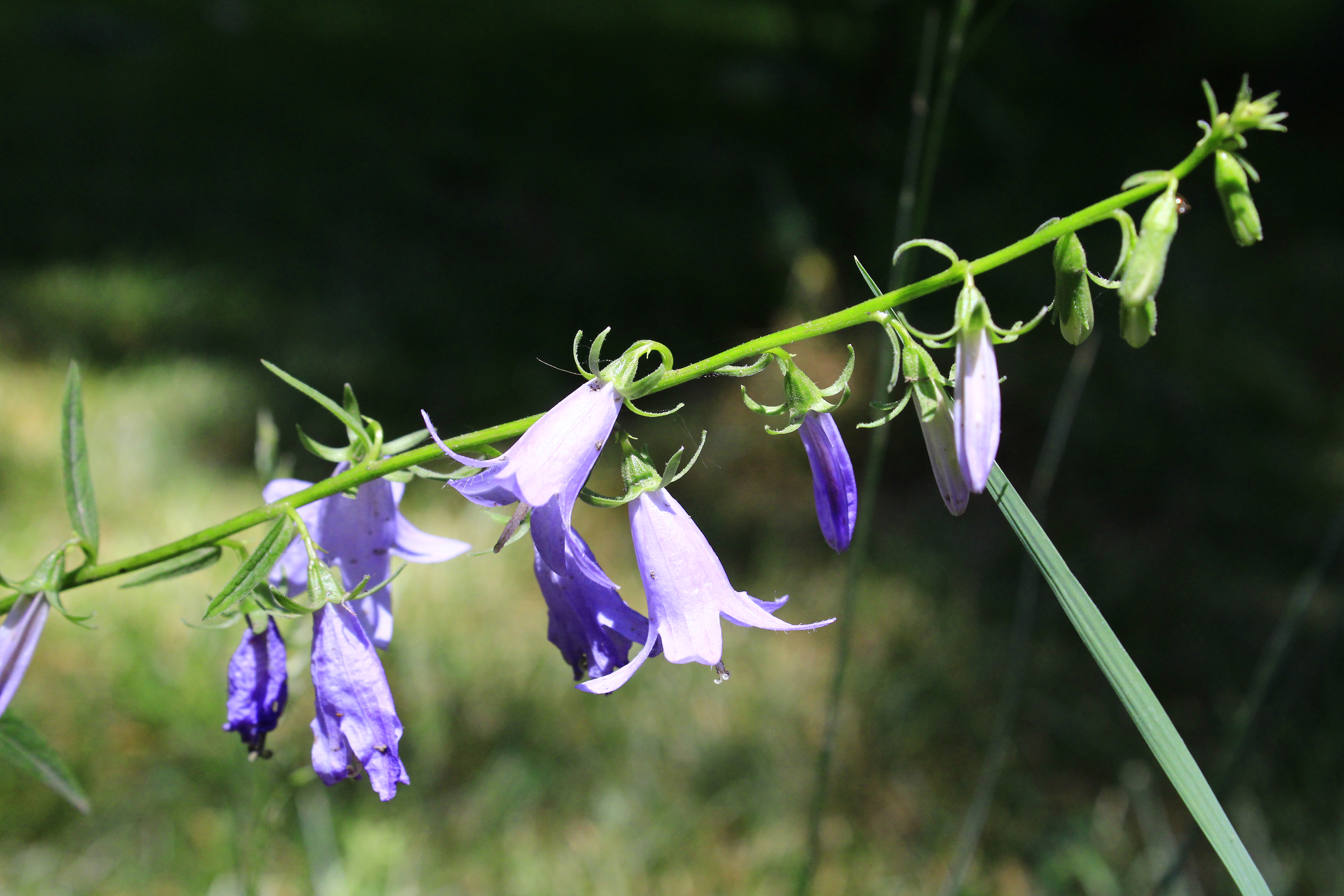
Unidentified Campanula in Tashkent Botanical Garden

The species include annual, biennial and perennial plants, and vary in habit from dwarf arctic and alpine species under 5 cm high, to large temperate grassland and woodland species growing to 2 metres (6 ft 7 in) tall.

== Description ==
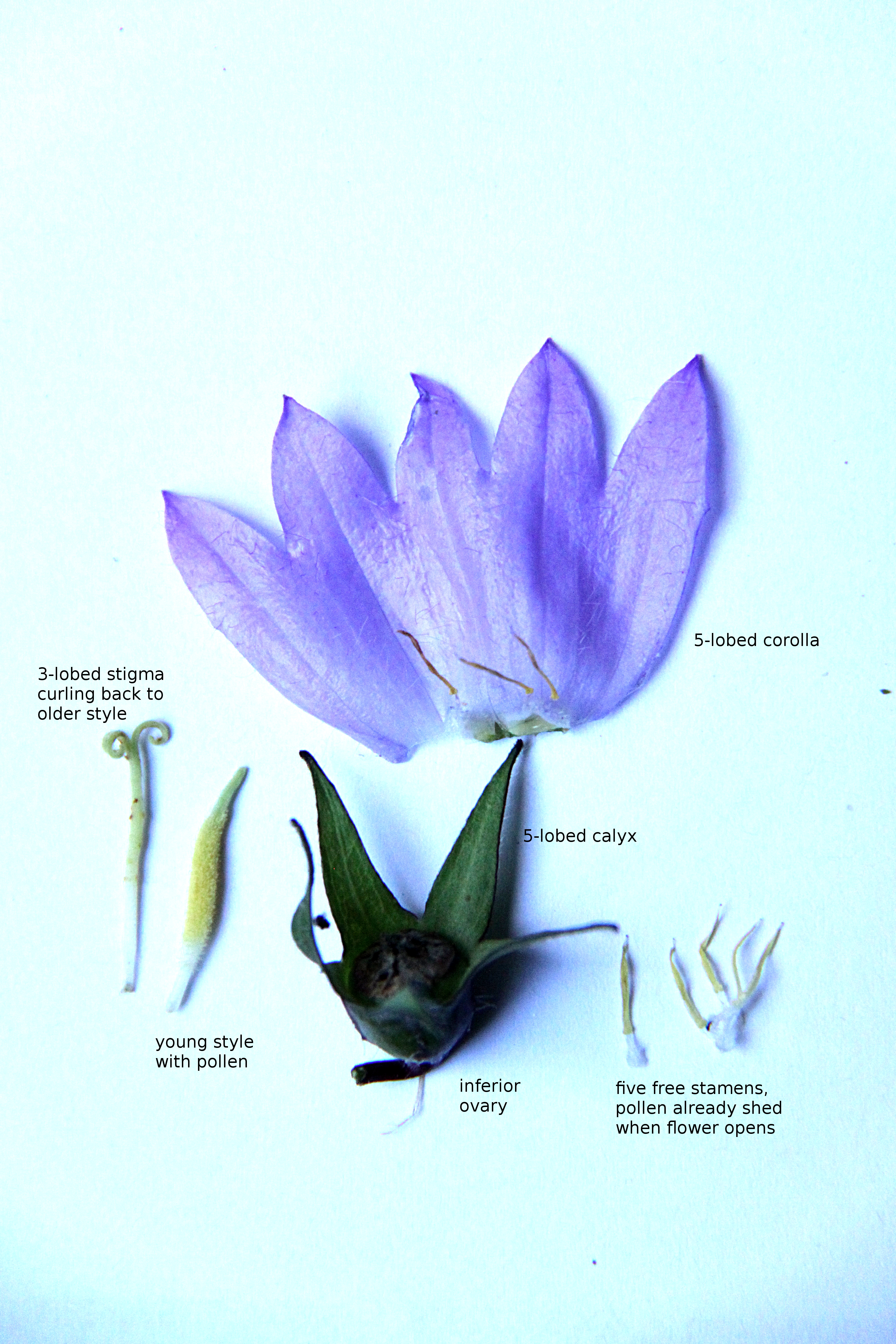

The leaves are alternate and often vary in shape on a single plant, with larger, broader leaves at the base of the stem and smaller, narrower leaves higher up; the leaf margin may be either entire or serrated (sometimes both on the same plant). Many species contain white latex in the leaves and stems.

The flowers are produced in panicles (sometimes solitary), and have a five-lobed corolla, typically large (2–5 cm or more long), mostly blue to purple, sometimes white or pink. Below the corolla, 5 leaf-like sepals form the calyx. Some species have a small additional leaf-like growth termed an "appendage" between each sepal, and the presence or absence, relative size, and attitude of the appendage is often used to distinguish between closely related species.

The fruit is a capsule containing numerous small seeds.

Campanula species are used as food plants by the larvae of some Lepidoptera species including common pug (recorded on harebell), dot moth, ingrailed clay (recorded on harebell), lime-speck pug and mouse moth.

== Cultivation and uses ==
Well-known species include the northern temperate Campanula rotundifolia, commonly known as harebell in England and bluebell in Scotland and Ireland (though it is not closely related to the true bluebells), and the southern European Campanula medium, commonly known as Canterbury bells (a popular garden plant in the United Kingdom). As well as several species occurring naturally in the wild in northern Europe, there are many cultivated garden species.

The cultivars 'Misty Dawn' and 'Kent Belle' have gained the Royal Horticultural Society's Award of Garden Merit.

The species Campanula rapunculus, commonly known as rampion bellflower, rampion, or rover bellflower, is a biennial vegetable which was once widely grown in Europe for its spinach-like leaves and radish-like roots. In many English translations of the Brothers Grimm's tale Rapunzel, rampion is the vegetable that is stolen from the witch. (Rapunzel is a completely different plant, Valerianella locusta.)

In the UK the National Collection of campanulas is held at Burton Agnes Hall in East Yorkshire and the National Collection of Alpine Campanulas at Langham Hall, Bury St Edmunds, in Suffolk.

== Related genera ==
The classification of some Campanulaceae genera as either part of Campanula or separate genera can vary by system, including Azorina, Campanulastrum, Canarina, Edraianthus, Musschia, Ostrowskia, and Platycodon. Some genera previously not segregated from Campanula currently are segregated in some systems, including Annaea, Gadellia, and Theodorovia. Hemisphaera was formerly Campanula, subsect. Scapiflorae, and Neocodon was Campanula sect. Rapunculus.

== Selected species ==
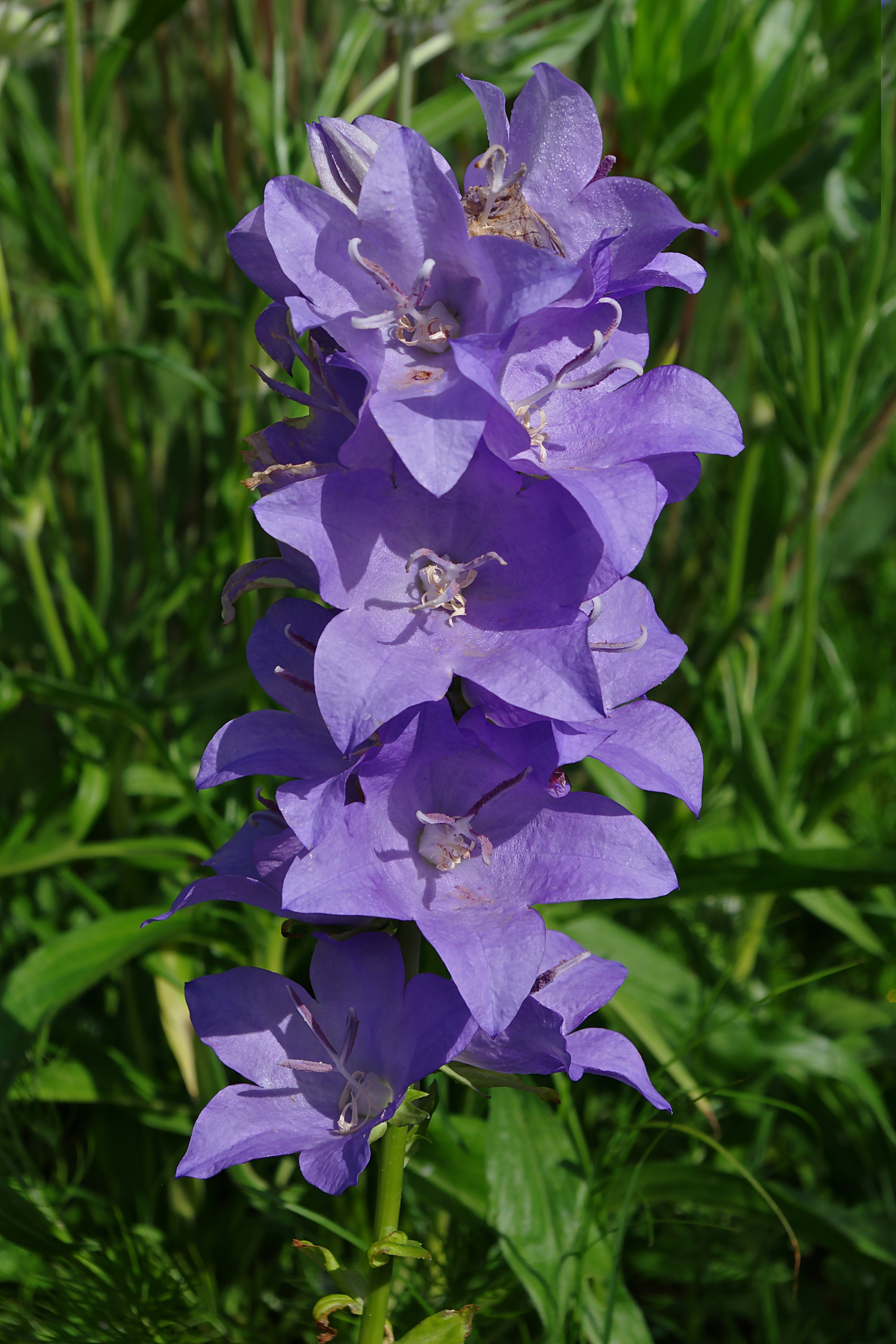
Campanula persicifolia

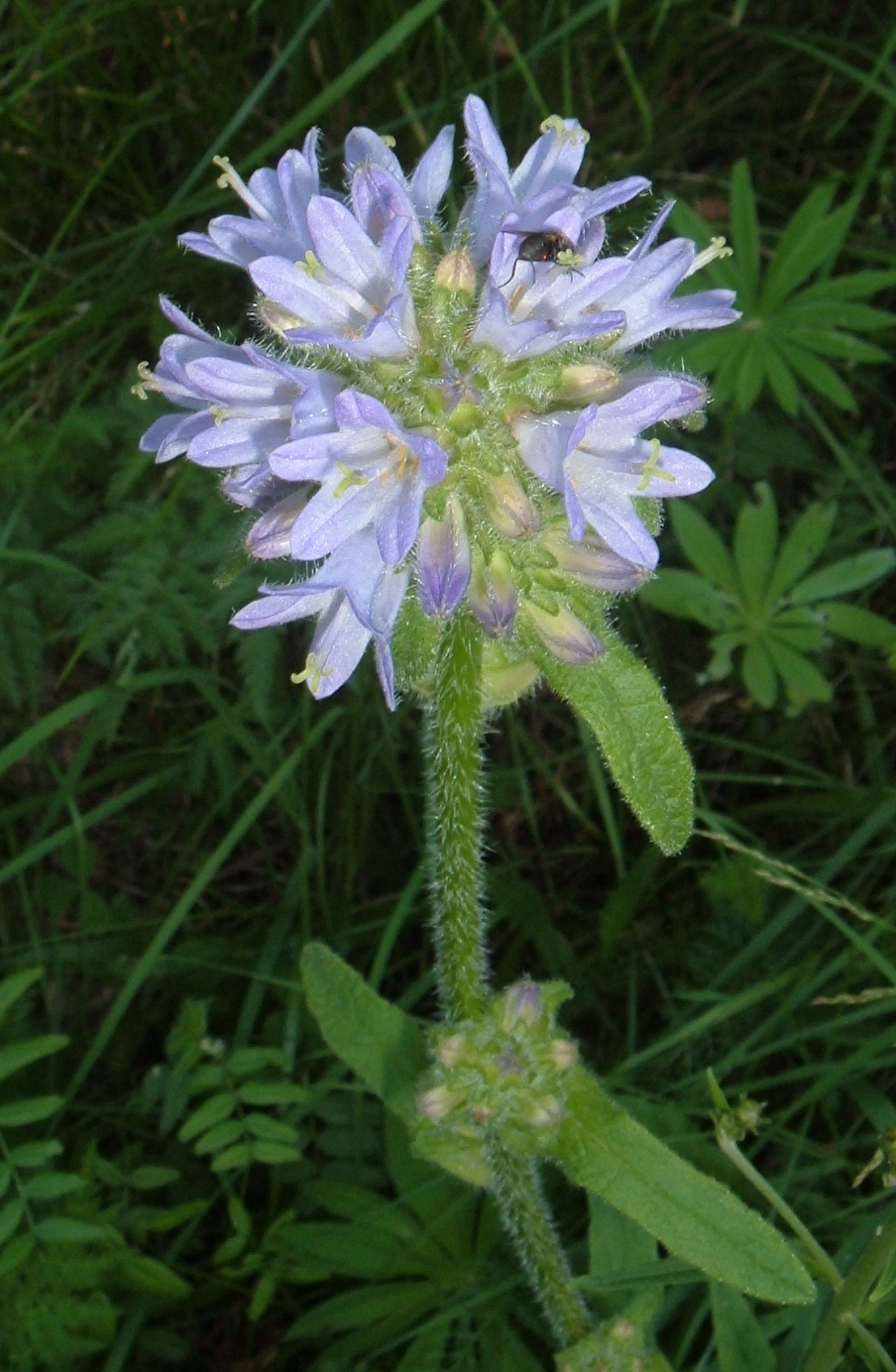
Campanula cervicaria

452 species are currently accepted. They include:

- Campanula aghrica Kit Tan & Sorger – Aghrian bellflower
- Campanula alaskana (A.Gray) W.Wight ex J.P.Anderson
- Campanula alliariifolia Willd. – Cornish bellflower
- Campanula alpestris All.
- Campanula alpina Jacq.
- Campanula balfourii J.Wagner & Vierh. – Socotra bellflower
- Campanula barbata L. – bearded bellflower
- Campanula betulifolia K.Koch
- Campanula bononiensis L.
- Campanula bravensis (Bolle) A.Chev.
- Campanula carpatica Jacq. – Carpathian bellflower
- Campanula cervicaria L. – bristly bellflower
- Campanula cochleariifolia Lam. – fairies' thimbles
- Campanula collina Sims – blue dwarf bellflower
- Campanula divaricata Michx. – Appalachian bellflower
- Campanula erinus L.
- Campanula garganica Ten. – Adriatic bellflower
- Campanula gelida Kovanda
- Campanula glomerata L. – clustered bellflower
- Campanula grandis Fisch. & C.A.Mey. – great bellflower
- Campanula hercegovina Degen & Fiala
- Campanula isophylla Moretti – Italian bellflower
- Campanula jacobaea C.Sm. ex Webb
- Campanula lactiflora M.Bieb. – milky bellflower
- Campanula lanata Friv.
- Campanula lasiocarpa Cham.
- Campanula latifolia L. – wide-leaved bellflower
- Campanula medium L. – Canterbury bells
- Campanula parryi A.Gray
- Campanula patula L. – spreading bellflower
- Campanula pendula M.Bieb.
- Campanula persicifolia L. – peach-leaved bellflower
- Campanula piperi Howell – Piper's bellflower
- Campanula portenschlagiana Schult. – Dalmatian or wall bellflower
- Campanula poscharskyana Degen – Serbian bellflower
- Campanula primulifolia Brot. – Spanish bellflower
- Campanula punctata Lam.
  - Campanula punctata var. punctata (synonym Campanula takesimana) – Korean bellflower
- Campanula pyramidalis L. – chimney bellflower
- Campanula raineri Perp. – Rainer's bellflower
- Campanula rapunculoides L. – creeping bellflower
- Campanula rapunculus L. – rampion bellflower
- Campanula rotundifolia L. – harebell, bluebell
- Campanula scabrella Engelm. – rough bellflower
- Campanula scheuchzeri Vill.
- Campanula scouleri Hook. ex A.DC. – Scouler's or pale bellflower
- Campanula serrata (Kit. ex Schult.) Hendrych
- Campanula shetleri Heckard – Castle Crags bellflower
- Campanula spicata L.
- Campanula thyrsoides L.
- Campanula trachelium L. – nettle-leaved bellflower

=== Formerly placed here ===
- Adenophora gmelinii (Spreng.) Fisch. (as C. coronopifolia Schult. or C. gmelinii Spreng.)
- Adenophora khasiana (Hook.f. & Thomson) Collett & Hemsl. (as C. khasiana Hook.f. & Thomson)
- Adenophora liliifolia (L.) Besser (as C. liliifolia L.)
- Adenophora triphylla (Thunb.) A.DC. (as C. tetraphylla Thunb. or C. triphylla Thunb.)
- Azorina vidalii (H.C.Watson) Feer (as C. vidalii H.C.Watson)
- Borago pygmaea (DC.) Chater & Greuter (as C. pygmaea DC.)
- Campanulastrum americanum (L.) Small (as Campanula americana) – American bellflower
- Eastwoodiella californica (Kellogg) Morin (as C. californica (Kellogg) A.Heller)
- Favratia zoysii (Wulfen) Feer (as C. zoysii Wulfen)
- Legousia pentagonia (L.) Druce (as C. pentagonia L.)
- Legousia speculum-veneris (L.) Durande ex Vill. (as C. speculum-veneris L.)
- Melanocalyx uniflora (L.) Morin (as C. uniflora L.)
- Platycodon grandiflorus (Jacq.) A.DC. (as C. glauca Thunb. or C. grandiflora Jacq.)
- Protocodon robinsiae (Small) Morin (as Campanula robinsiae Small)
- Ravenella angustiflora (Eastw.) Morin (as C. angustiflora Eastw.)
- Ravenella exigua (Rattan) Morin (as C. exigua Rattan)
- Ravenella griffinii (Morin) Morin (as C. griffinii Morin)
- Ravenella sharsmithiae (Morin) Morin (as C. sharsmithiae Morin)
- Rotanthella floridana (S.Watson ex A.Gray) Morin (as Campanula floridana S.Watson ex A.Gray)
- Smithiastrum wilkinsianum (Greene) Morin (as C. wilkinsiana Greene) – Wilkin's bellflower
- Triodanis perfoliata (L.) Nieuwl. (as C. perfoliata L.)
- Wahlenbergia linarioides (Lam.) A.DC. (as C. linarioides Lam.)
- Wahlenbergia marginata (Thunb.) A.DC. C. gracilis G.Forst. or C. marginata Thunb.)
- Wahlenbergia undulata (L.f.) A.DC. (as C. undulata L.f.)

== Chemistry ==
Violdelphin is an anthocyanin, a type of plant pigment, found in the blue flowers in the genus Campanula.

== Fossil record ==
Three fossil seeds of †Campanula palaeopyramidalis have been extracted from borehole samples of the Middle Miocene fresh water deposits in Nowy Sacz Basin, West Carpathians, Poland.
