= List of Balkan endemic plants =

The Balkan endemic plants includes a number of unique taxa and (species, subspecies, variety and forms) that are widespread in a variety of sizes area and, including stenoendemics.

The following list of endemic plants on the Balkans includes taxa from Bulgaria, Greece, Albania, Kosovo, North Macedonia, Serbia, Bosnia and Herzegovina, Montenegro, Croatia, Slovenia and the European part of Turkey. The northeast limit of this area is the Sava river valley. The boundary then continues along the Danube. It also includes the Pannonian zone of the Balkans up to southern Romania.

Observed endemics are classified in 163 genera and 52 families.

== A ==
- Abies borisii-regis, Pinaceae
- Abies cephalonica, Pinaceae
- Abies omorika, Pinaceae
- Acanthus balcanicus, Acanthaceae
- Acer heldreichii, Aceraceae
- Achillea ageratifolia, Asteraceae
- Achillea clypeolata, Asteraceae
- Achillea depressa, Asteraceae
- Achillea pannonica, Asteraceae
- Acinos majoranifolius, Lamiaceae
- Acinos orontius, Lamiaceae (Labiateae)
- Alchemilla jumrukczalica, Rosaceae
- Alchemilla vranicensis, Rosaceae
- Alkanna pulmonaria ssp. noneiformis, Boraginaceae
- Allium melanantherum, Amaryllidaceae
- Alyssum doerfleri, Brassicaceae
- Alyssum mellendorffianum, Brassicaceae
- Amphoricarpus bertisceus, Asteraceae
- Amphoricarpus neumayeri, Asteraceae
- Anemone transsilvanica, Ranunculaceae
- Anthemis carpatica, Asteraceae
- Anthemis jordanovii, Asteraceae
- Aquilegia amaliae var. dinarica, Ranunculaceae
- Aquilegia aurea, Ranunculaceae
- Aquilegia chrysantha var. aurea, Ranunculaceae
- Aquilegia dinarica, Ranunculaceae
- Aquilegia grata, Ranunculaceae
- Aquilegia nigricans ssp. subscaposa, Ranunculaceae
- Arabis ferdinandi-coburgii, Brassicaceae
- Arenaria rhodopaea, Caryophyllaceae
- Arnebia densiflora, Boraginaceae
- Asperula hercegovina, Rubiaceae
- Aster tripolium ssp. pannonicus, Asteraceae
- Astragalus alopecurus, Fabaceae
- Astragalus exscapus, Fabaceae
- Astragalus peterfii, Fabaceae
- Astragalus physocalyx, Fabaceae
- Astragalus pseudopurpureus, Fabaceae
- Astragalus roemeri, Fabaceae
- Athamanta macedonica, Apiaceae
- Athamanta turbith ssp hungarica, Apiaceae
- Avenochloa decora, Poaceae

== B ==
- Barbarea bosniaca, Brassicaceae
- Barbarea vulgaris, Brassicaceae
- Brassica nivalis ssp. jordanoffii, Brassicaceae
- Bromopsis moesiaca, Poaceae
- Bruckenthalia spiculifolia, Ericaceae
- Bupleurum aristatum var. karglii, Apiaceae

== C ==
- Campanopsis dalmatica, Campanulaceae
- Campanula albanica, Campanulaceae
- Campanula cespitosa,
- Campanula elatines var. fenestrellata, Campanulaceae
- Campanula graminifolia var. linearifolia, Campanulaceae
- Campanula hercegovina, Campanulaceae
- Campanula jacquinii ssp. rumeliana, Campanulaceae
- Campanula linifolia ssp. justiniana, Campanulaceae
- Campanula oreadum, Campanulaceae
- Campanula romanica, Campanulaceae
- Campanula scutellata, Campanulaceae
- Campanula tommasiniana, Campanulaceae
- Campanula velebitica, Campanulaceae
- Campanula waldsteiniana, Campanulaceae
- Cardamine maritima, Brassicaceae
- Carduus collinus, Asteraceae
- Carduus kerneri ssp. lobulatiformis, Asteraceae
- Carduus rhodopaeus, Asteraceae
- Carex riloensis, Cyperaceae
- Carum velenovskyi, Apiaceae
- Centaurea achtarovii, Asteraceae
- Centaurea biokovensis, Asteraceae
- Centaurea derventana, Asteraceae (Compositae)
- Centaurea jankae, Asteraceae
- Centaurea kernerana, Asteraceae
- Centaurea macedonica, Asteraceae
- Centaurea mannagettae, Asteraceae
- Centaurea parilica, Asteraceae
- Centaurea phrygia ssp. rarauensis,
- Centaurea phrygia ssp. ratezatensis, Asteraceae
- Centaurea pinnatifida, Asteraceae
- Centaurea pontica, Asteraceae
- Centaurea trichocephala, Asteraceae
- Cephalaria radiata, Caprifoliaceae
- Cerastium banaticum, Caryophyllaceae
- Cerastium decalvans, Caryophyllaceae
- Cerastium fontanum ssp. grandiflorum, Caryophyllaceae
- Cerastium transsylvanicum, Caryophyllaceae
- Chamaecytisus tommasinii, Fabaceae
- Chamaedrys ecytisus tommasinii, Fabaceae (Papilionaceae)
- Chamaedrys montana, Lamiaceae
- Chondrilla urumovii, Asteraceae
- Cicerbita pancicii, Asteraceae
- Cirsium appendiculatum, Asteraceae
- Cirsium brachycephalum, Asteraceae
- Clinopodium frivaldszkyanum, Lamiaceae
- Colchicum bulbocodioides ssp. hungaricum, Colchicaceae
- Colchicum callicymbium, Colchicaceae
- Colchicum hungaricum var. doerfleri, Colchicaceae
- Corothamnus agnipilus, Fabaceae
- Corothamnus rectipilosus, Fabaceae
- Crepis dinarica, Compositae (Asteraceae)
- Crepis macedonia, Asteraceae
- Crepis pantocseki, Asteraceae (Cichoriaceae)
- Crepis praemorsa ssp. dinarica, Asteraceae
- Crepis schachtii, Asteraceae
- Crocus cvijicii, Iridaceae
- Crocus lageniflorus var. oliverianus, Iridaceae
- Crocus scardicus, Iridaceae
- Crocus sieberi, Iridaceae
- Crocus veluchensis, Iridaceae
- Cyanus napuliferus, Asteraceae
- Cynoglossum hungaricum, Boraginaceae

== D ==
- Daphne kosaninii, Thymelaeaceae
- Daphne malyana, Thymelaeaceae
- Daphne pontica, Thymelaeaceae
- Degenia velebitica, Brassicaceae
- Delphinium simonkaianum, Ranunculaceae
- Dianthus bertisceus, Caryophyllaceae
- Dianthus callizonus, Caryophyllaceae
- Dianthus carthusianorum ssp. tenuifolius, Caryophyllaceae
- Dianthus freyni, Caryophyllaceae
- Dianthus glacilis ssp. gelidus, Caryophyllaceae
- Dianthus henteri, Caryophyllaceae
- Dianthus knapii, Caryophyllaceae
- Dianthus microlepis, Caryophyllaceae
- Dianthus petraeus, Caryophyllaceae
- Dianthus spiculifolius, Caryophyllaceae
- Dioscorea balcanica, Dioscoreaceae
- Draba dorneri, Brassicaceae
- Draba haynaldii, Brassicaceae
- Draba simonkaiana, Brassicaceae

== E ==
- Echinops bannaticus, Asteraceae
- Edraianthus glisicii, Campanulaceae
- Edraianthus graminifolius ssp. niveus, Campanulaceae
- Edraianthus niveus, Campanulaceae
- Edraianthus serpyllifolius ssp. dinaricus, Campanulaceae
- Edraianthus sutjeskae, Campanulaceae
- Ephedra major, Ephedraceae
- Eranthus hyemalis var. bulgaricus, Ranunculaceae
- Eryngium palmatum, Apiaceae
- Eryngium serbicum, Apiaceae
- Eulsatilla rhodopaea, Ranunculaceae
- Euphorbia gregersenii, Euphorbiaceae
- Euphorbion myrsinitum, Euphorbiaceae

== F ==
- Festuca bucegiensis, Poaceae
- Festuca nitida ssp. flaccida, Poaceae
- Festuca rupicola ssp. pachyphylla, Poaceae
- Festuca versicolor, Poaceae
- Forsythia europaea, Oleaceae
- Fritillaria drenovskii, Liliaceae
- Fritillaria graeca, Liliaceae
- Fritillaria gussichiae, Liliaceae
- Fritillaria pontica, Liliaceae
- Fritillaria skorpili, Liliaceae
- Fumaria jankae, Papaveraceae

== G ==
- Galatella albanica, Asteraceae
- Galium capitatum, Rubiaceae
- Galium demissum ssp. stojanovii, Rubiaceae
- Galium rhodopeum, Rubiaceae
- Galium valantioides var. baillonii, Rubiaceae
- Genista lydia ssp. rumelica, Fabaceae
- Gentiana albanica, Gentianaceae
- Gentiana dinarica, Gentianaceae
- Gentiana laevicalyx, Gentianaceae
- Gentiana pontica, Gentianaceae
- Gentianella bulgarica, Gentianaceae
- Geum bulgaricum, Rosaceae
- Geum rhodopeum, Rosaceae
- Globularia cordifolia, Plantaginaceae
- Goniolimon besseranum, Plumbaginaceae

== H ==
- Haberlea rhodopensis, Gesneriaceae
- Halacsya sendtneri, Boraginaceae
- Halacsya sendtneri, Boraginaceae
- Haplophyllum balcanicum, Rutaceae
- Heliosperma retzdorffianum, Caryophyllaceae
- Heptaptera macedonica, Apiaceae
- Herniaria olympica, Caryophyllaceae
- Hesperis dinarica, Brassicaceae
- Hesperis matronalis ssp. nivea, Brassicaceae
- Hesperis matronalis ssp. schurii, Brassicaceae
- Hieracium praebiharicum, Asteraceae
- Hippocrepis comosa, Fabaceae
- Hypericum cerastoides, Hypericaceae
- Hypericum rhodopeum, Hypericaceae
- Hypericum haplophylloides, Hypericaceae

== I ==
- Iberis sempervirens, Brassicaceae
- Inula macedonicus, Asteraceae
- Inula verbascifolia ssp. aschersoniana, Asteraceae
- Iris bosniaca, Iridaceae
- Iris suaveolens, Iridaceae
- Ixoca macrantha, Caryophyllaceae

== J ==
- Jasione montana f. heldreichii, Campanulaceae
- Jasionella bulgarica, Campanulaceae
- Johrenia distans, Apiaceae
- Juncellus pannonicus, Cyperaceae
- Juniperus sabina, Cupressaceae
- Jurinea tzar-ferdinandii, Asteraceae

== K ==
- Kitaibela vitifolia, Malvaceae
- Knautia albanica, Caprifoliaceae
- Knautia macedonica, Caprifoliaceae
- Knautia sarajevoensis, Caprifoliaceae
- Koeleria subaristata, Poaceae

== L ==
- Lathraea rhodopaea, Orobanchaceae
- Lathyrus binatus, Fabaceae
- Lathyrus panicicii, Fabaceae
- Leucanthemum chloratum, Asteraceae
- Lilium bosniacum, Liliaceae
- Lilium cattaniae, Liliaceae
- Lilium pyrenaicum var. albanicum, Liliaceae
- Lilium pyrenaicum var. jankae, Liliaceae
- Lilium rhodopeum, Liliaceae
- Limonium asterotrichum, Plumbaginaceae
- Linum dolomiticum, Linaceae
- Linum elegans, Linaceae
- Linum rhodopeum, Linaceae
- Linum thracicum, Linaceae
- Linum uninerve, Linaceae

== M ==
- Malcolmia orsiniana ssp. orsiniana, Brassicaceae
- Marrubium friwaldskyanum, Lamiaceae
- Marrubium velutinum, Lamiaceae
- Melampyrum dorflerii, Scrophulariaceae
- Melampyrum trichocalycinum, Scrophulariaceae
- Merendera rhodopea, Colchicaceae
- Minuartia bosniaca, Caryophyllaceae
- Minuartia cataractarum, Caryophyllaceae
- Minuartia halacsyi, Caryophyllaceae
- Minuartia handelii, Caryophyllaceae
- Minuartia hirsuta, Caryophyllaceae
- Minuartia velutina, Caryophyllaceae
- Moltkia doerfleri, Boraginaceae

== N ==
- Narthecium scardicum, Nartheciaceae
- Navicularia scardica, Lamiaceae
- Noccaea bellidifolia, Brassicaceae
- Noccaea kovatsii, Brassicaceae
- Noccaea praecox, Brassicaceae

== O ==
- Onobrychis montana, Fabaceae
- Onosma rhodopea, Boraginaceae
- Onosma thracica, Boraginacea
- Onosma visianii, Boraginaceae
- Origanum striatum, Lamiaceae
- Ornithogalum orthophyllum ssp. acuminatum, Asparagaceae
- Ornithogalum umbellatum ssp. orthophyllum, Asparagaceae
- Oxytropis kozhuharovii, Fabaceae
- Oxytropis jacquinii, Fabaceae
- Oxytropis prenja, Fabaceae
- Oxytropis urumovii, Fabaceae

== P ==
- Papaver corona-sancti-stephani, Papaveraceae
- Papaver degenii, Papaveraceae
- Paronychia kapela, Caryophyllaceae
- Pedicularis brachyodonta, Orobanchaceae
- Pedicularis hoermanniana, Scrophulariaceae
- Pedicularis orthantha, Orobanchaceae
- Peridictyon sanctum, Poaceae
- Petteria ramentacea, Fabaceae
- Picea omorika, Pinaceae
- Pimpinella serbicum, Apiaceae
- Pinguicula balcanica, Lentibulariaceae
- Pinguicula hirtiflora, Lentibulariaceae
- Pinus heldreichii, Pinaceae
- Pinus nigra ssp. dalmatica, Pinaceae
- Pirinia koenigii, Caryophyllaceae
- Plantago atrata, Plantaginaceae
- Poa dolosa, Poaceae
- Poa granitica ssp. disparilis, Poaceae
- Polygala carniolica, Polygalaceae
- Polygala rhodoptera, Polygalaceae
- Polygala supina, Polygalaceae
- Potentilla chrysantha, Rosaceae
- Potentilla deorum, Rosaceae
- Potentilla fruticosa, Rosaceae
- Primula auricula ssp. serratifolia, Primulaceae
- Primula deorum, Primulaceae
- Primula frondosa, Primulaceae
- Primula kitaibeliana, Primulaceae
- Primula kitaibeliana, Primulaceae
- Primula wulfeniana, Primulaceae
- Puccinellia limosa, Poaceae
- Pulsatilla slavjankae, Ranunculaceae

== Q ==
- Quercus protoroburoides, Fagaceae

== R ==
- Ramonda heldreichii, syn. Jankaea heldreichii, Gesneriaceae
- Ramonda nathaliae, Gesneriaceae
- Ramonda serbica, Gesneriaceae
- Ranunculus hayekii, Ranunculaceae
- Ranunculus illyricus, Ranunculaceae
- Ranunculus montenegrinus, Ranunculaceae
- Ranunculus pedatus, Ranunculaceae
- Ranunculus sartorianus, Ranunculaceae
- Ranunculus serbicus, Ranunculaceae
- Rheum rhaponticum, Polygonaceae
- Rorippa lippizensis, Brassicaceae
- Rosa balcarica, Rosaceae
- Rosa parilica, Rosaceae
- Rumex balcanicus, Polygonaceae

== S ==
- Salvia brachiodon, Lamiaceae
- Salvia eichleriana, Lamiaceae
- Salvia pratense var. varbossania, Lamiaceae
- Saponaria sicula ssp. stranjensis, Caryophyllaceae
- Satureja horvatii, Lamiaceae
- Satureja rumelica, Lamiaceae
- Saxifraga ferdinandi-coburgi, Saxifragaceae
- Saxifraga mutata ssp. demissa, Saxifragaceae
- Saxifraga prenja, Saxifragaceae
- Saxifraga stribrnyi, Saxifragaceae
- Scabiosa rhodopensis, Caprifoliaceae
- Scilla litardierei, Asparagaceae
- Sclarea transsylvanica, Lamiaceae
- Scorodonia arduinii, Lamiaceae
- Scrophularia aestivalis, Scrophulariaceae
- Scrophularia bosniaca, Scrophulariaceae
- Scrophularia tristis, Scrophulariaceae
- Secale strictum, Poaceae
- Sedum kostovii, Crassulaceae
- Sedum stefco, Crassulaceae
- Sedum zollikoferi, Crassulaceae
- Senecio bosniacus, Asteraceae
- Senecio macedonicus, Asteraceae
- Senecio pancicii, Asteraceae
- Seseli leucospermum, Apiaceae
- Sibiraea laevigata, Rosaceae
- Sibirea croatica, Rosaceae
- Sideritis elica, Lamiaceae
- Sideritis purpurea, Lamiaceae
- Sideritis raiseri, Lamiaceae
- Sideritis scardica, Lamiaceae
- Sideritis theezans, Lamiaceae
- Silene altaica, Caryophyllaceae
- Silene balcanica, Caryophyllaceae
- Silene degeneri, Caryophyllaceae
- Silene dinarica, Caryophyllaceae
- Silene flavescens, Caryophyllaceae
- Silene gigantea, Caryophyllaceae
- Silene hayekiana, Caryophyllaceae
- Silene nivalis, Caryophyllaceae
- Silene pindicola, Caryophyllaceae
- Silene reichenbachii, Caryophyllaceae
- Silene retzdorffiana, Caryophyllaceae
- Silene trojanensis, Caryophyllaceae
- Silene vallesia ssp. graminea, Caryophyllaceae
- Soldanella hungarica, Primulaceae
- Soldanella pindicola, Primulaceae
- Solenanthus stamineus, Boraginaceae
- Sorbus bordasii, Rosaceae
- Sorbus graeca, Rosaceae
- Stachys iva, Lamiaceae
- Stachys spinulosa ssp. milanii, Lamiaceae
- Strobus peuce, Pinaceae
- Succisella petteri, Dipsacaceae
- Symphiandra hofmannii, Campanulaceae

== T ==
- Thelapsi dacicum ssp. banaticum, Orchidaceae
- Thesium kernerianum, Santalaceae
- Thymus bihoriensis, Lamiaceae
- Thymus stojanovii, Lamiaceae
- Tithymalus barrelieri ssp. hercegovinus, Euphorbiaceae
- Tithymalus gregersenii, Euphorbiaceae
- Tithymalus montenegrinus, Euphorbiaceae
- Tithymalus velenovskyi, Euphorbiaceae
- Tragopogon balcanicus, Asteraceae
- Trifolium durmitoreum, Fabaceae
- Trifolium velenowskyi, Fabaceae
- Trifolium wettsteinii, Fabaceae
- Trisetum altaicum, Poaceae
- Tulipa hungarica var. urumoffii, Liliaceae
- Tulipa pavlovii, Liliaceae
- Tulipa rhodopea, Liliaceae

== V ==
- Verbascum balcanicum, Scrophulariaceae
- Verbascum bosnense, Scrophulariaceae
- Verbascum davidovii, Scrophulariaceae
- Verbascum durmitoreum, Scrophulariaceae
- Verbascum humile ssp. rhodopaeum, Scrophulariaceae
- Verbascum pelium, Scrophulariaceae
- Veronica rhodopaea, Plantaginaceae
- Veronica saturejoides, Plantaginaceae
- Veronica serpyllifolia ssp. humifusa, Plantaginaceae
- Veronica turrilliana, Plantaginaceae
- Vicia montenegrina, Fabaceae
- Vicia ochroleuca ssp. dinara, Fabaceae
- Viola calcarata, Violaceae
- Viola dacica, Violaceae
- Viola delphinantha, Violaceae
- Viola grisebachiana, Violaceae
- Viola jooi, Violaceae
- Viola orphanidis, Violaceae
- Viola perinensis, Violaceae
- Viola rhodopeia, Violaceae
- Viola tricolor ssp. macedonica, Violaceae
- Viola vilaensis, Violaceae

== W ==
- Wahlenbergia graminifolia, Campanulaceae
- Wahlenbergia serbica, Campanulaceae
- Wulfenia baldaccii, Plantaginaceae
- Wulfenia blecicii, Plantaginaceae
- Wulfenia rohlenae, Plantaginaceae

== Y ==
- Youngia altaica, Asteraceae
