= Bayuvi Dupki–Dzhindzhiritsa =

Nature reserve in south-western Bulgaria

Bayuvi Dupki–Dzhindzhiritsa Nature Reserve
- IUCN category Ia (strict nature reserve)
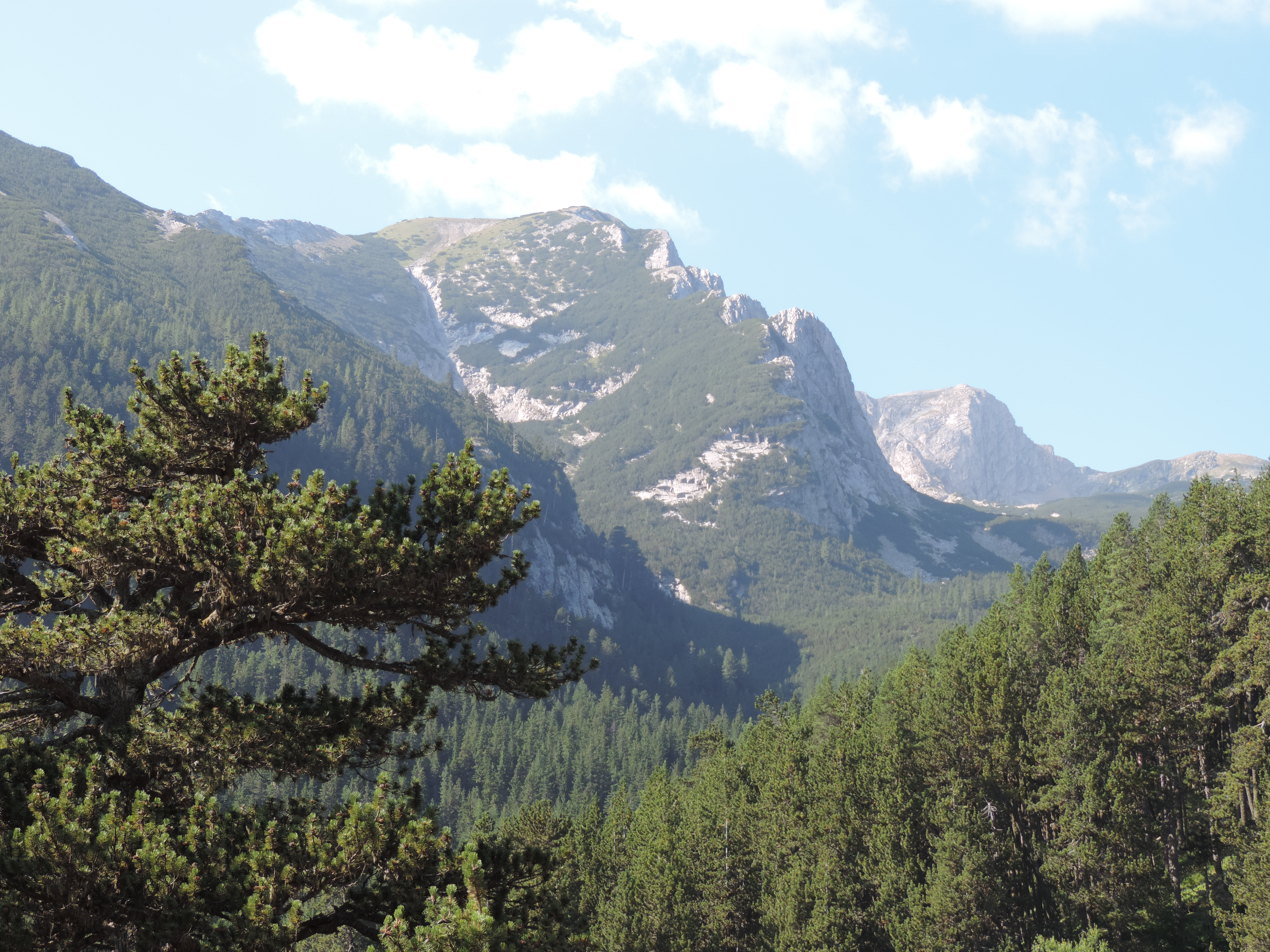

- Location within Bulgaria
- Location: Razlog Municipality, Blagoevgrad Province, Bulgaria
- Nearest city: Razlog, Bansko
- Coordinates: 41°50′3.12″N 23°19′59.17″E
- Area: 28.73 km^{2} (11.09 sq mi)
- Established: 1934
- Governing body: Ministry of Environment and Water

Bayuvi Dupki–Dzhindzhiritsa (Bulgarian: Баюви дупки–Джинджирица), also spelled Doupki–Djindjiritza, is a nature reserve in Pirin National Park, located in the homonymous mountain range in south-western Bulgaria. It is situated in Razlog Municipality, Blagoevgrad Province. Bayuvi Dupki–Dzhindzhiritsa is among the nation's oldest reserves, declared in 1934 to protect the forests of Macedonian pine (Pinus peuce) and Bosnian pine (Pinus heldreichii), both Balkan endemic species. Its territory was further expanded in 1976 and 1980 and spans an area of 2873 ha or 28,73 km^{2}. It was declared a UNESCO Biosphere Reserve in 1977. The reserve encompasses territory between 1200 and 2907 m altitude. Geologically it is dominated by Proterozoic marbles and has extensive karst terrain with numerous caves and karst formations.

== Flora ==
The flora consists of around 500 species of vascular plants. Among the rare and endemic vascular plants are European blueberry (Vaccinium myrtillus), Aquilegia aurea, Oxytropis urumovii, great yellow gentian (Gentiana lutea), golden root (Rhodiola rosea), edelweiss (Leontopodium alpinum) and Pirin poppy (Papaver degenii). The plant species Oxytropis kozhuharovii is endemic to Bayuvi Dupki–Dzhindzhiritsa.

About 60% of the reserve is covered by forests, consisting mainly of Macedonian pine (Pinus peuce) and Bosnian pine (Pinus heldreichii). Other tree species are Scots pine (Pinus sylvestris), black pine (Pinus nigra), Norway spruce (Picea abies) and European silver fir (Abies alba). The average age of the woods is over 150 years, reached at places over 500 year. Some areas of the Malka Dzhindzhiritsa forest is between 500 and 550 years old. Some Macedonian pines reach heights of over 45 m and diameter of more than 2 m; some individual trees have an age of over 1000 years.

The higher sections of the reserve are covered by dwarf mountain pine (Pinus mugo) formation reaching age of 100 years. The average height of these bushes is 1.5 to 2 m but reaches 3 m in certain areas.

== Fauna ==
The chamois is a typical representative of the fauna and one of the symbols of the reserve. Other important conservation species include brown bear, gray wolf, European pine marten, beech marten, red fox, roe deer, wild boar, red squirrel, western capercaillie, golden eagle, hazel grouse, Eurasian three-toed woodpecker, spotted nutcracker, etc. Typical representatives of reptilians and amphibians are common European viper, Aesculapian snake, viviparous lizard and common frog.
