= Urumov =

Urumov (Russian: Уру́мов) is a Russian and Bulgarian surname. People with the surname include:

- Emil Urumov (born 1984), Bulgarian footballer
- Ivan Urumov (1856 – 1937), Bulgarian botanist
- Zoran Urumov (born 1977), Serbian footballer
- Arkady Ourumov, fictitious villain in the 1995 James Bond film GoldenEye
