= L. nivalis =

L. nivalis may refer to:

- Leptonycteris nivalis, a bat species
- Lychnis nivalis, a species of plant in the Caryophyllaceae (pink/carnation) family
- Luzula nivalis, a species of plant in the Juncaceae (rush) family
