= Oxytropis kozhuharovii =

Conservation status
- Critically Endangered (IUCN 3.1)

Scientific classification
- Kingdom: Plantae
- Clade: Tracheophytes
- Clade: Angiosperms
- Clade: Eudicots
- Clade: Rosids
- Order: Fabales
- Family: Fabaceae
- Subfamily: Faboideae
- Genus: Oxytropis
- Species: O. kozhuharovii

Binomial name
- Oxytropis kozhuharovii D.K.Pavlova, D.Dimitrov & M.Nikolova

Species of flowering plant

Oxytropis kozhuharovii is a species of flowering plant in the legume family endemic to Bulgaria, where it is restricted to the Pirin mountain range. There, it is found at altitudes of 2,550–2,700 m in a single locality, the Yavorov anticline in Bayuvi Dupki–Dzhindzhiritsa Nature Reserve of Pirin National Park.

Unlike the other Oxytropis species endemic to Pirin, Oxytropis urumovii, Oxytropis kozhuharovii is a tetraploid and is also the only Bulgarian Oxytropis with blue or purple flowers, the others being yellow. Its most distinctive feature is the indumentum of the calyx, particularly the apex, which is very densely covered with long white hairs, which equal or exceed the calyx teeth. Although it is superficially similar to Oxytropis halleri, it is most closely related to Oxytropis prenja.

It grows on limestone rocks with shallow humus-carbonate soils and is found in grassy alpine meadow communities with species, such as Onobrychis scardica, Cerastium decalvans, Campanula velebitica, Saxifraga ferdinandi-coburgi, Potentilla apennina, Thymus perinicus, Leontopodium nivale, Armeria alpina, etc.
