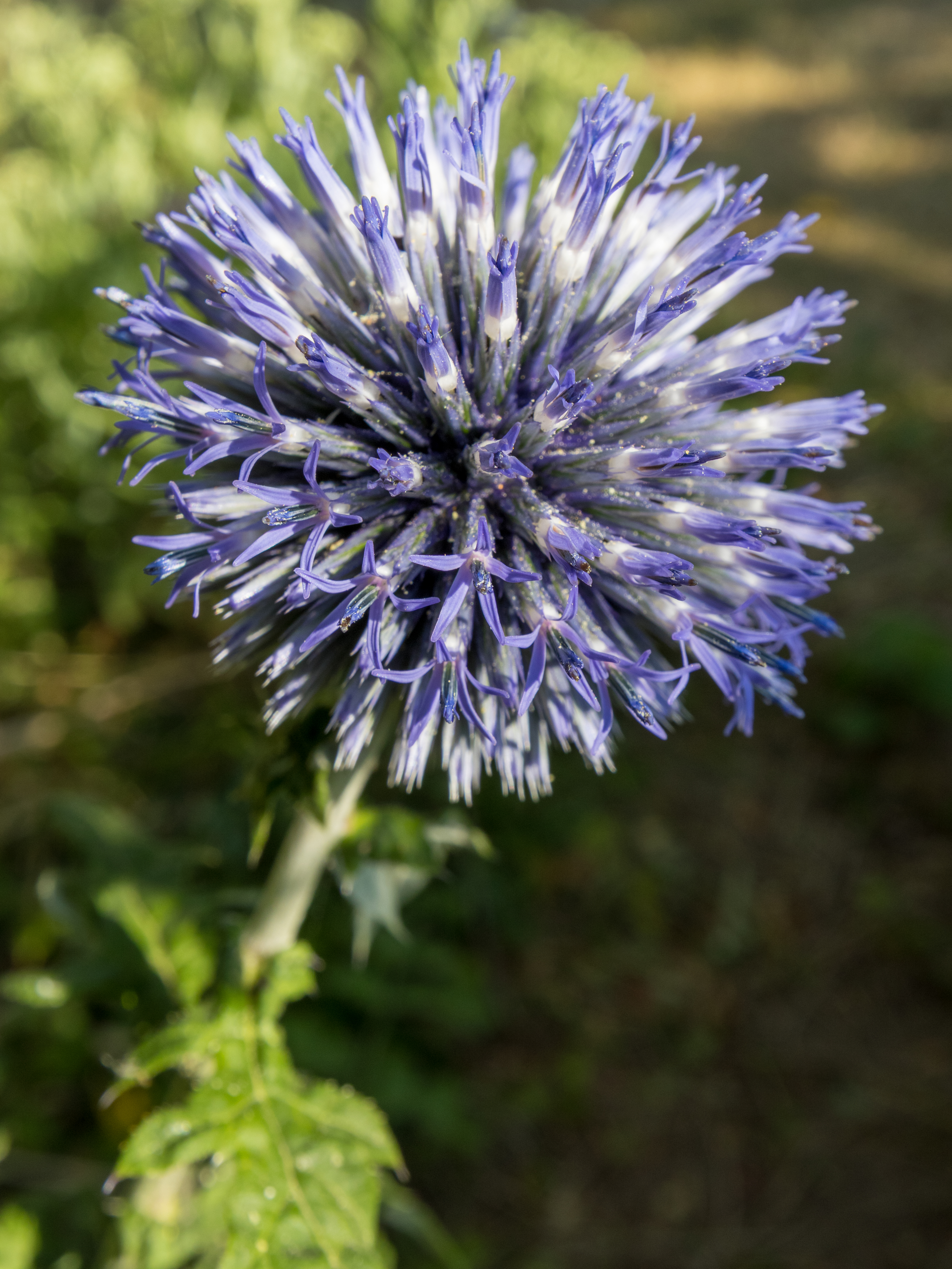

Scientific classification
- Kingdom: Plantae
- Clade: Embryophytes
- Clade: Tracheophytes
- Clade: Spermatophytes
- Clade: Angiosperms
- Clade: Eudicots
- Clade: Asterids
- Order: Asterales
- Family: Asteraceae
- Genus: Echinops
- Species: E. bannaticus

Binomial name
- Echinops bannaticus Rochel ex Schrad.

Synonyms
- Echinops armatus Steven; Echinops quercifolius Freyn; Echinops rochelianus Griseb.

= Echinops bannaticus =

Species of flowering plant

Echinops bannaticus, known as the blue globe-thistle, is a species of flowering plant in the family Asteraceae, native to southeastern Europe. It is a herbaceous perennial thistle, growing to 120 cm (47 in), with prickly foliage and spherical blue flower heads in summer.

The Latin specific epithet bannaticus refers to the Banat, a region in Central Europe (now split between Romania, Hungary, and Serbia) where the plant is found.

The species is widely naturalised in Great Britain.

== Gallery ==
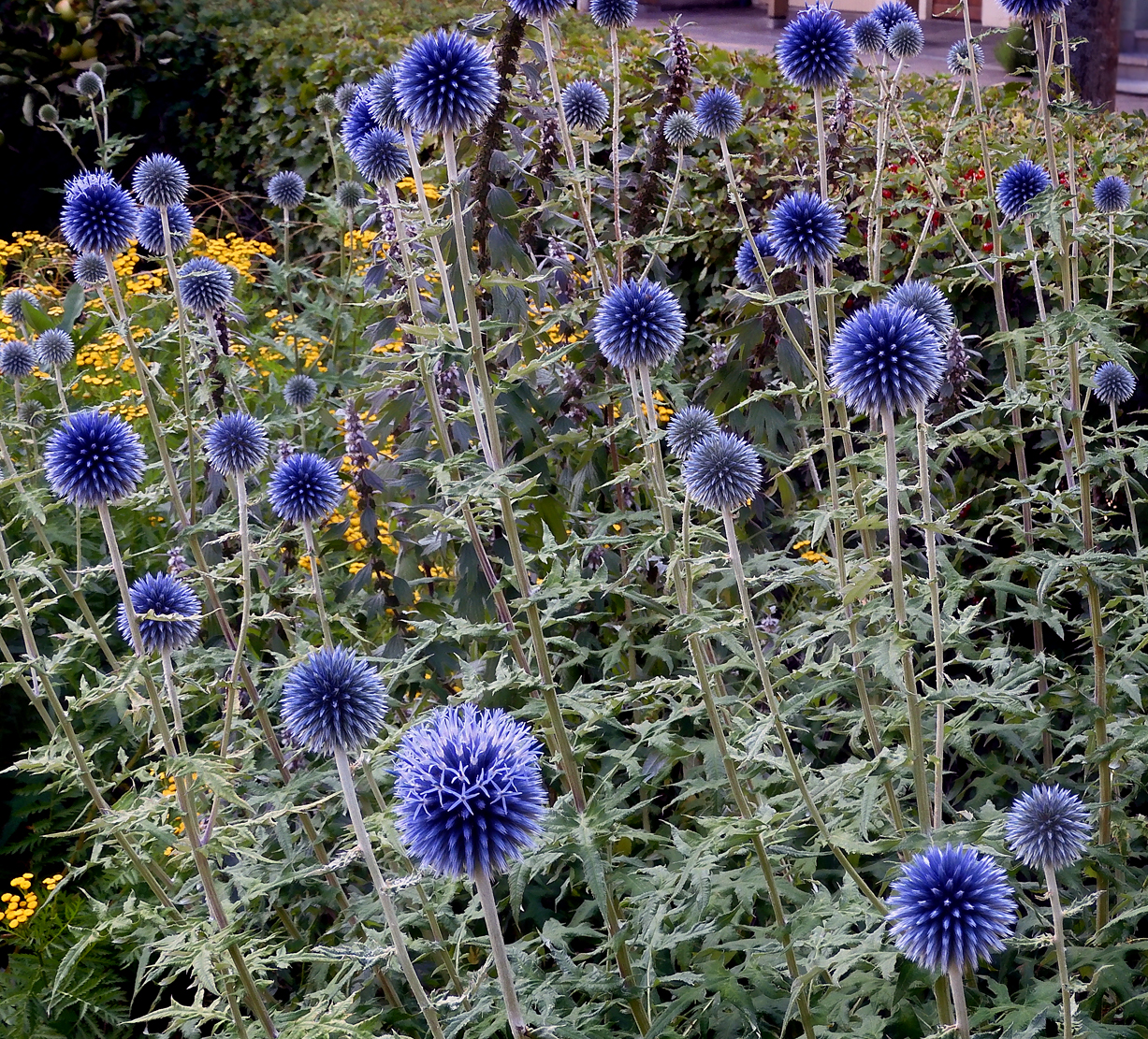

== See also ==
- List of Balkan endemic plants
