= Minuartia bosniaca =

Scientific classification
- Kingdom: Plantae
- Clade: Tracheophytes
- Clade: Angiosperms
- Clade: Eudicots
- Order: Caryophyllales
- Family: Caryophyllaceae
- Genus: Minuartia
- Species: M. bosniaca

Binomial name
- Minuartia bosniaca (Beck) K.Malý

Synonyms
- Alsine bosniaca Beck: Alsine rostrata Murb., non Pers.

Species of flowering plant

Minuartia bosniaca, or Bosnian sandwort, in Bosnian bosanska mišjakinjica, is endemic plant at East Dinaric mountains. Itbelongs to family of Caryophyllaceae (carnations).

== Description ==
Bosnian sandwort is a perennial herb with mild to dense turf, about 15–30 cm high. Its stems are numerous, usually erect, rarely standing or prostrate. By the grounds you less – more numb, and at the bottom of branched, bare or bristled hairy, with numerous sterile leafy shoots. The Leaves are linear shaped or linear thread-like or the pointed. Fitting to the stem, and long have been around 5–8 (−10) mm, and at the base expanded and ciliary. They have leathery circumference and 3 clearly expressed nerve.

Inflorescence is slightly racemous and compact, with the more flowers. It blossoms from May to July. Flower stems are bare or hairy. Sepals are narrow lancet, white, long 3–4 mm. Goals are short or hairy, long, pointed, with a green stripe in the middle has a whitish nerve. The crown is white, and the petals shorter than the cup or the same length. They are elongated ovoid, and basically 5 outside stamen and the cylindrical extended and ruptured glands but it seems there are 10 bracts are linear lanceolate, mostly shorter or equal to the flower. Fruit is capsule, ovate cylindrical, double short of the cup. The seeds are small, light, long 0.8–1 mm wide and 0.5–0.8 mm, spiny wart.

== Ecology and distribution ==
Bosnian sandwort grows on limestone and serpentine rockeries and dry rocky pastures, the majority of the sub-alpine zone of vegetation. It is extremely heliophyte type. It is restricted endemic to Southeast Dinarides (Bosnia and Herzegovina, Montenegro and Serbia), as well as in North Albania. Locus classicus is in Bosnia: on the rocks around Sarajevo (Beck, G. 1898).

== See also ==
- List of Balkan endemic plants
