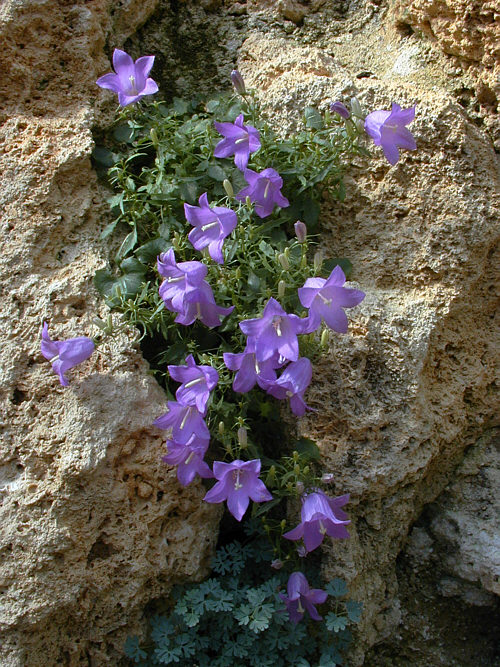

Scientific classification
- Kingdom: Plantae
- Clade: Tracheophytes
- Clade: Angiosperms
- Clade: Eudicots
- Clade: Asterids
- Order: Asterales
- Family: Campanulaceae
- Genus: Campanula
- Species: C. hercegovina

Binomial name
- Campanula hercegovina (A.Degen) 1886

= Campanula hercegovina =

Herzegovinian bellflower

Species of flowering plant

Campanula hercegovina, the Herzegovinian bellflower, is an endemic plant from Bosnia and Herzegovina. It belongs to the Campanulaceae, or bellflower, family.

== Description ==
Herzegovinian bellflower is a fragile perennial cushion plant with a length of 12–20 cm, sometimes 40 cm. It has a thick, lumpy semiwoody rhizome which can penetrate deep into the cracks of limestone cliffs. Its stems are numerous, square, and highly bendable. The leaves of sterile individuals are gathered in tufts, ovate, pointed, with a heart-shaped base. Both sides have 2–3 teeth and stems are about three times longer than the lamina.

It blossoms from June to August. The flowers are in clusters of 2–5, with 1–3 bracts. The crown is bare, light blue, split into five triangular lobes.

The fruit is a poricidal capsule containing numerous seeds. It opens on the side, thanks to the 3-5 holes, and the top of the fruit remains closed. The seeds are about 1 mm in length and about 0.3 mm wide. The diploid chromosome of these bellflowers is 2n = 24.

== Distribution and ecology ==
It is endemic from the Southeast Dinaric mountains to Albania. In Bosnia and Herzegovina, the largest local populations are in the canyons of Neretva, Rakitnica, Diva Grabovica, and Drežnica rivers, in the Prenj, Čvrsnica, Čabulja, Piasa, and Velež mountains.

This plant grows on limestone rocks in mountainous areas.

== See also ==
- List of Balkan endemic plants
