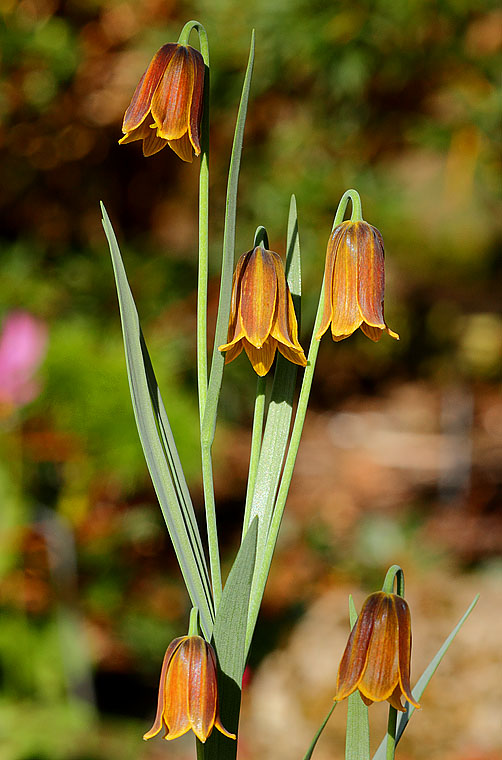

Conservation status
- Vulnerable (IUCN 3.1)

Scientific classification
- Kingdom: Plantae
- Clade: Tracheophytes
- Clade: Angiosperms
- Clade: Monocots
- Order: Liliales
- Family: Liliaceae
- Subfamily: Lilioideae
- Tribe: Lilieae
- Genus: Fritillaria
- Species: F. drenovskii

Binomial name
- Fritillaria drenovskii Degen & Stoj.

= Fritillaria drenovskii =

Species of flowering plant

Fritillaria drenovskii is a rare European species of plants in the lily family, native to Blagoevgrad Province in southwestern Bulgaria where it is found it the mountain ranges of Pirin and Slavyanka, as well as northeastern Greece.

The species is listed as "vulnerable" by the IUCN Red List. It is included in the Red Data Book of the Republic of Bulgaria.

== See also ==
- List of Balkan endemic plants

== Sources ==
- Golemanski, Vasil; Peev, Dimitar; Chipev, Nesho; Beron, Petar; Biserkov, Valko (2015). Red Book of Bulgaria, Volume I (in Bulgarian). Sofia: Bulgarian Academy of Sciences. ISBN 978-954-9746-18-1.
