= Daphne malyana =

Scientific classification
- Kingdom: Plantae
- Clade: Tracheophytes
- Clade: Angiosperms
- Clade: Eudicots
- Clade: Rosids
- Order: Malvales
- Family: Thymelaeaceae
- Genus: Daphne
- Species: D. malyana

Binomial name
- Daphne malyana Blecic

Species of shrub

Daphne malyana is a shrub, of the family Thymelaeaceae. It is native to Montenegro, Serbia, and Bosnia.

== Description ==
The shrub is deciduous to semi-evergreen, and grows up to 15 cm tall. It is scented, bears orange fruit, and flowers white. It is often found in crevices of limestone rocks.

== See also ==
- List of Balkan endemic plants
