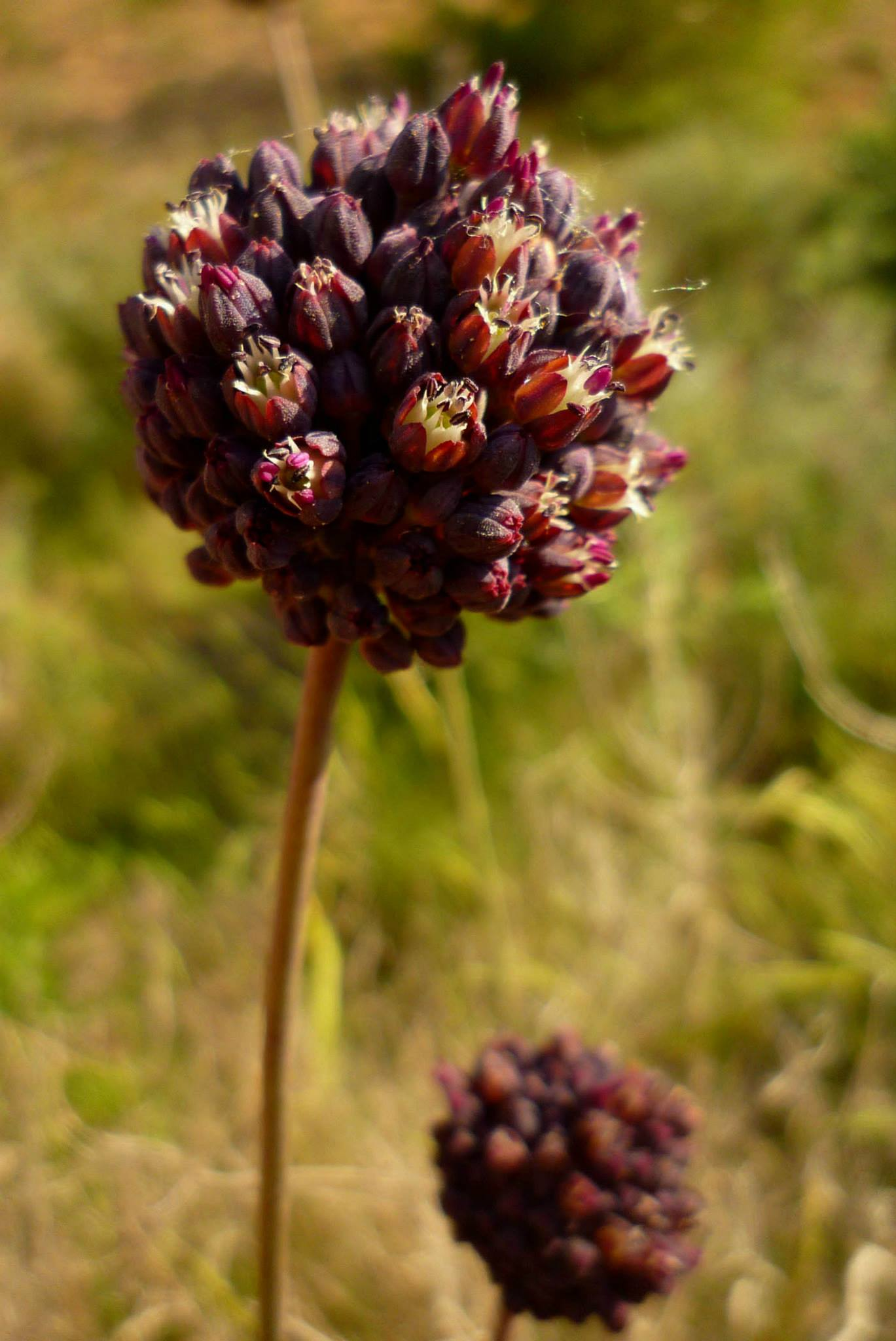
- Inflorescence

Conservation status
- Least Concern (IUCN 3.1)

Scientific classification
- Kingdom: Plantae
- Clade: Tracheophytes
- Clade: Angiosperms
- Clade: Monocots
- Order: Asparagales
- Family: Amaryllidaceae
- Subfamily: Allioideae
- Genus: Allium
- Subgenus: A. subg. Allium
- Species: A. melanantherum

Binomial name
- Allium melanantherum Pancic

= Allium melanantherum =

Species of flowering plant

Allium melanantherum is a species of flowering plant in the family Amaryllidaceae and is native to Bulgaria, Greece, Montenegro, Slovenia, Bosnia and Herzegovina, Serbia, North Macedonia and Croatia. It is found in grasslands and rocky landscapes up to about 2,000 m (6,600 ft).
