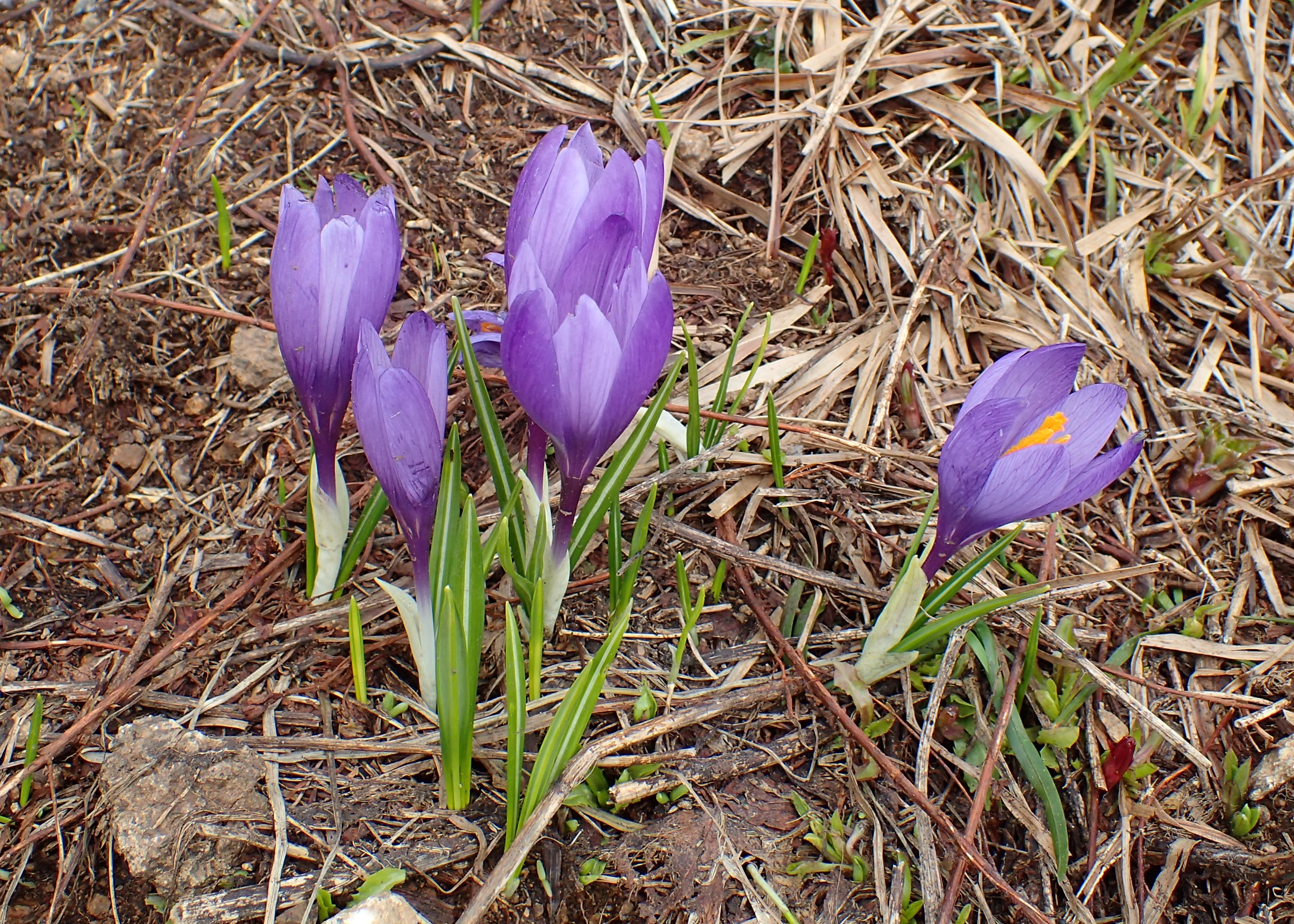
- Crocus veluchensis

Scientific classification
- Kingdom: Plantae
- Clade: Tracheophytes
- Clade: Angiosperms
- Clade: Monocots
- Order: Asparagales
- Family: Iridaceae
- Genus: Crocus
- Species: C. veluchensis

Binomial name
- Crocus veluchensis Herb.

Synonyms
- Crocus balcanensis Janka; Crocus orbelicus Stoj.; Crocus pallasii Griseb; Crocus tomoricus Markgr.; Crocus veluchensis subsp. balcanensis (Janka) Nyman; Crocus veluchensis var. micranthus Randjel. & D.A.Hill

= Crocus veluchensis =

Species of flowering plant

Crocus veluchensis is a species of flowering plant in the family Iridaceae. It is a cormous perennial native to central and southern Albania, Bulgaria, Greece and North Macedonia. In Bulgaria it is widespread in the mountain ranges of Rila, Pirin, the Rhodope Mountains, the Balkan Mountains, Sredna Gora, Vitosha, Belasitsa, Slavyanka and others.

== Gallery ==
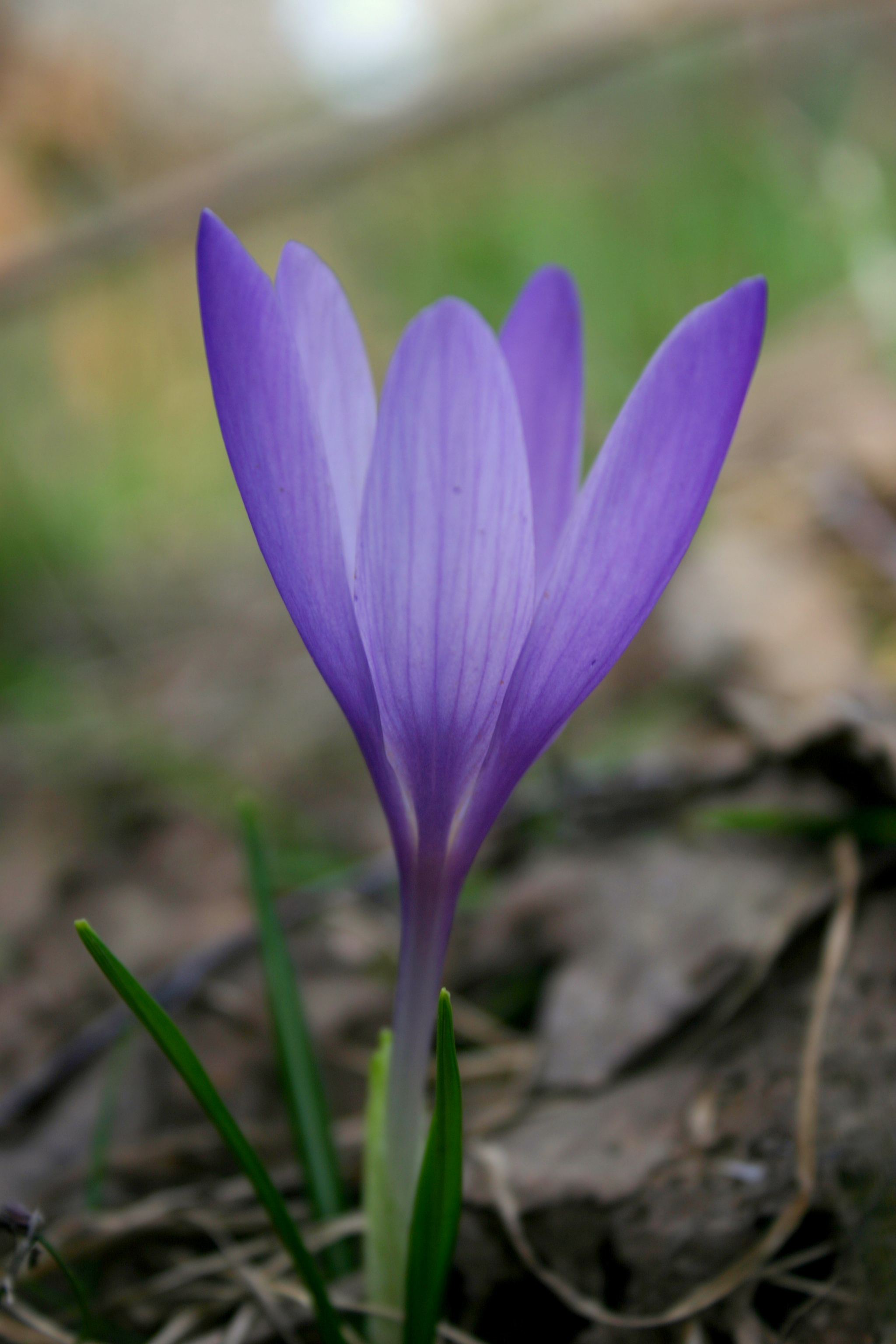

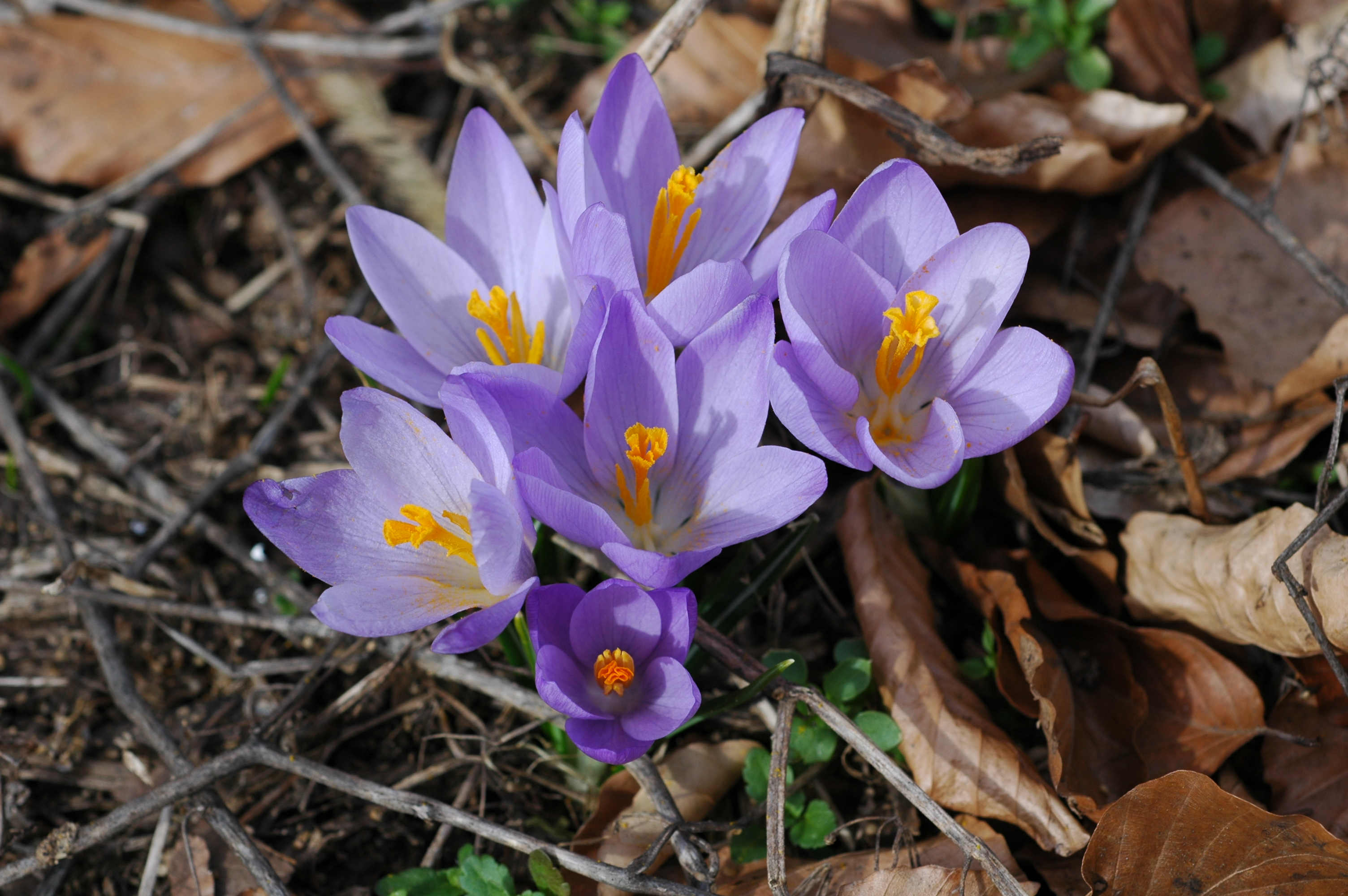

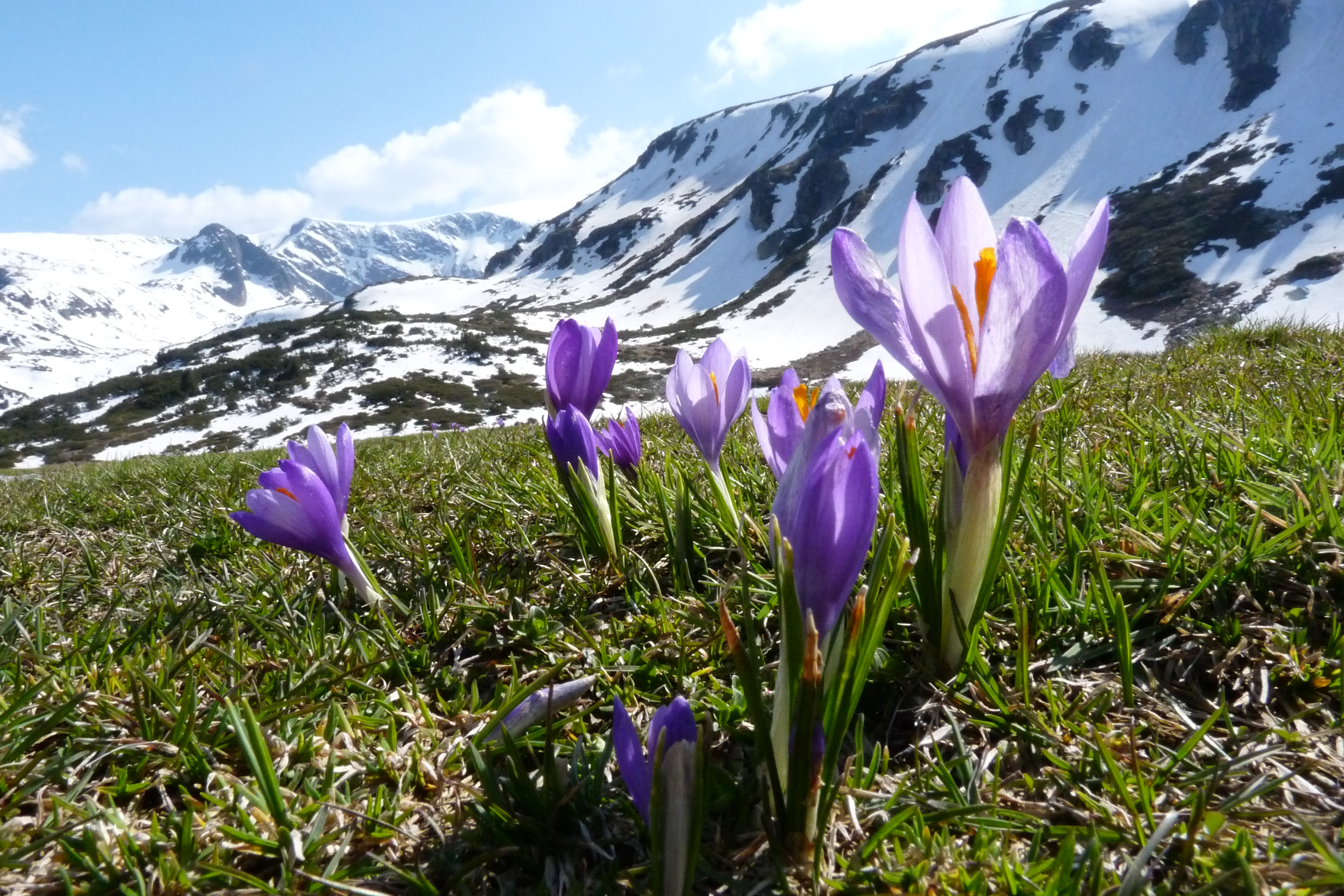

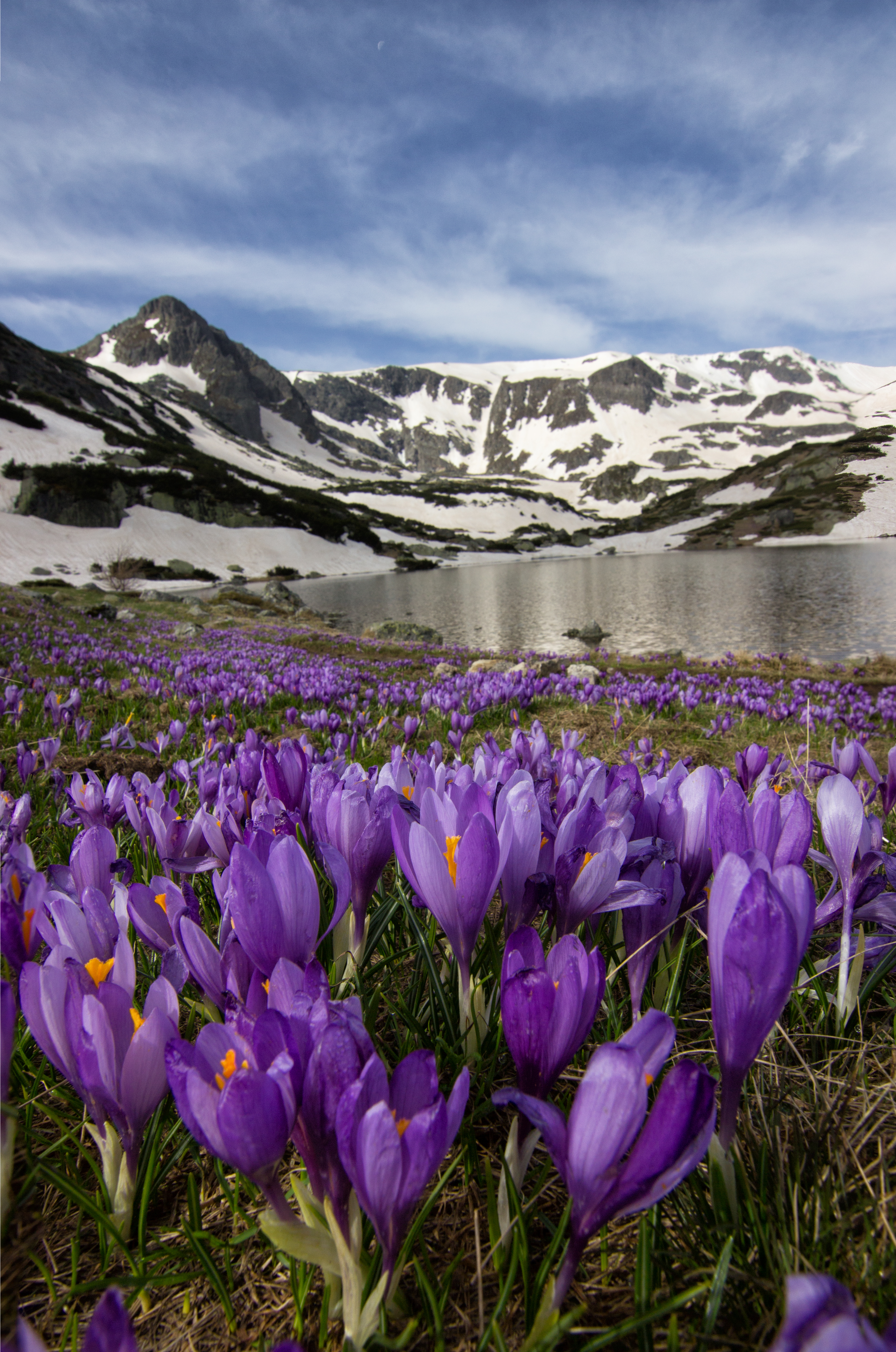
