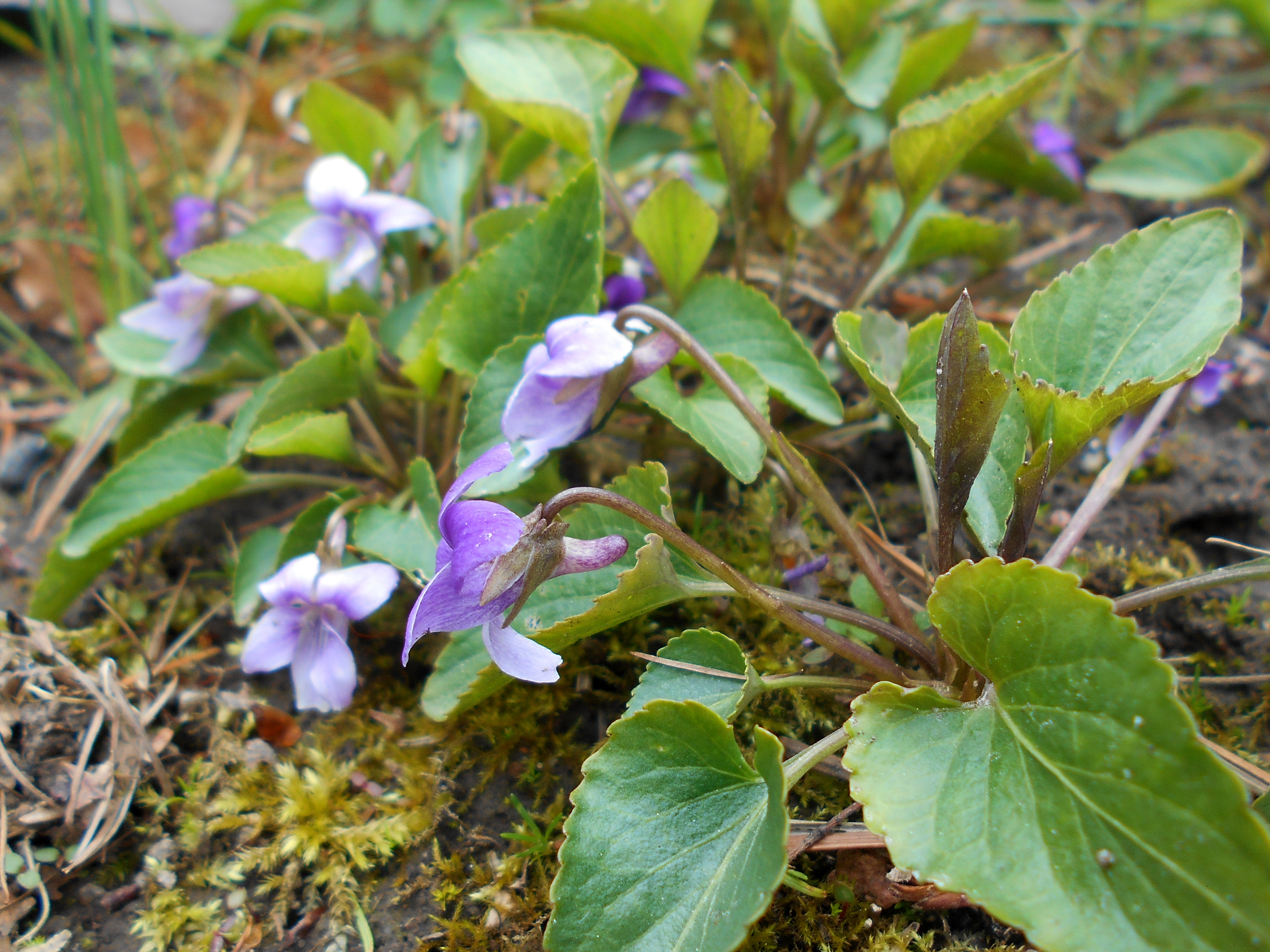
- Habit
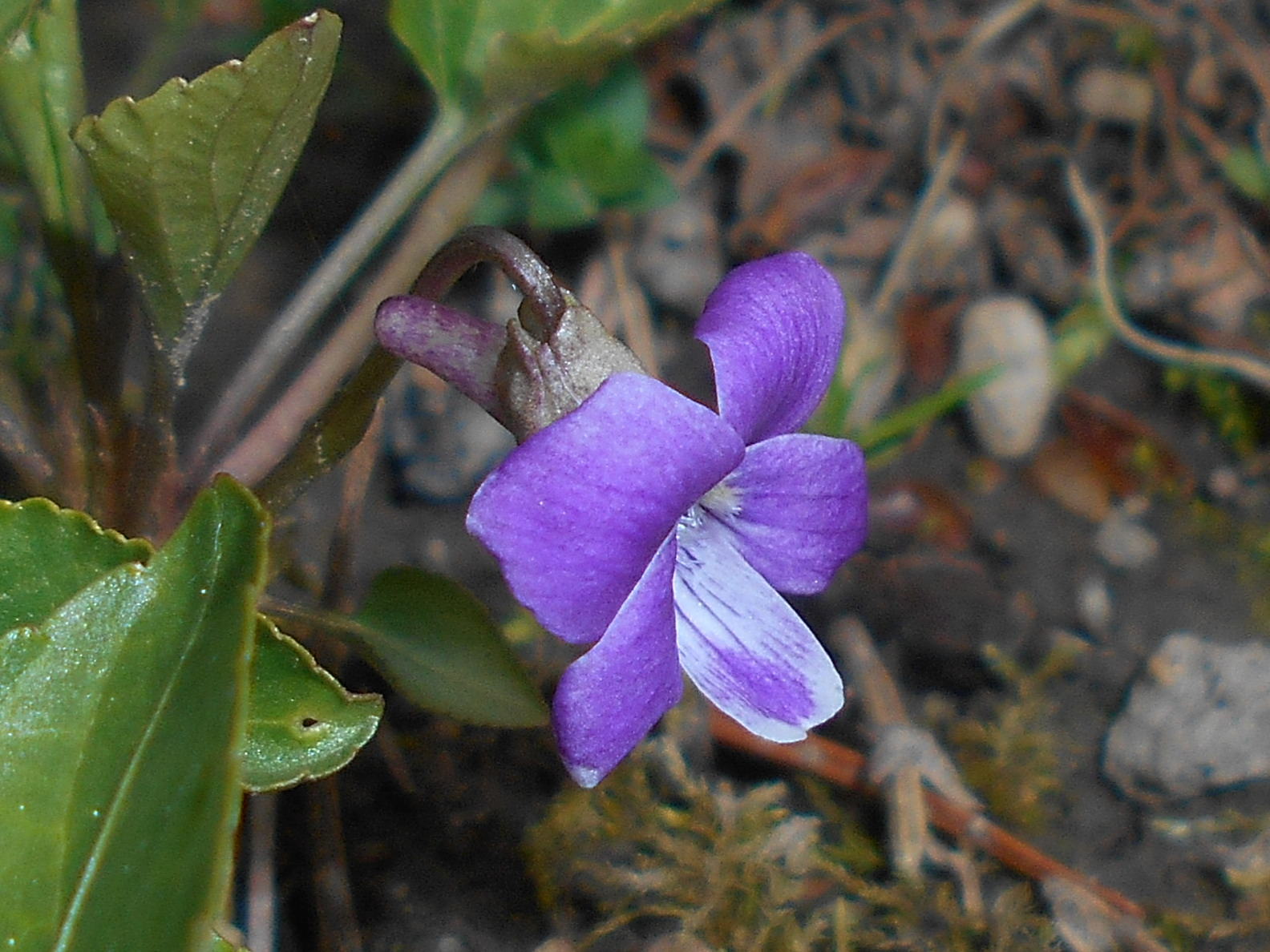
- Close-up of flower

Scientific classification
- Kingdom: Plantae
- Clade: Tracheophytes
- Clade: Angiosperms
- Clade: Eudicots
- Clade: Rosids
- Order: Malpighiales
- Family: Violaceae
- Genus: Viola
- Species: V. jooi

Binomial name
- Viola jooi Janka

Synonyms
- Viola sciaphila Joó ex Janka; Viola transsilvanica Schur

= Viola jooi =

Species of flowering plant

Viola jooi, the Carpathian violet or Transylvanian violet, is a species of flowering plant in the family Violaceae, native to Romania and Ukraine. It is a relict species of calcicolous rock outcrops.
