= Rosa balcarica =

Scientific classification
- Kingdom: Plantae
- Clade: Embryophytes
- Clade: Tracheophytes
- Clade: Spermatophytes
- Clade: Angiosperms
- Clade: Eudicots
- Clade: Rosids
- Order: Rosales
- Family: Rosaceae
- Genus: Rosa
- Species: R. balcarica

Binomial name
- Rosa balcarica Galushko

Species of flowering plant

Rosa balcarica is a species of flowering plant in the family Rosaceae. It belongs to the genus Rosa. This species is native to the Central Caucasus region. It is a shrub and typically grows in temperate zones.

It was first published in Botanicheskie Materialy Gerbariya Botanicheskogo Instituta Komarova Akademii Nauk.
