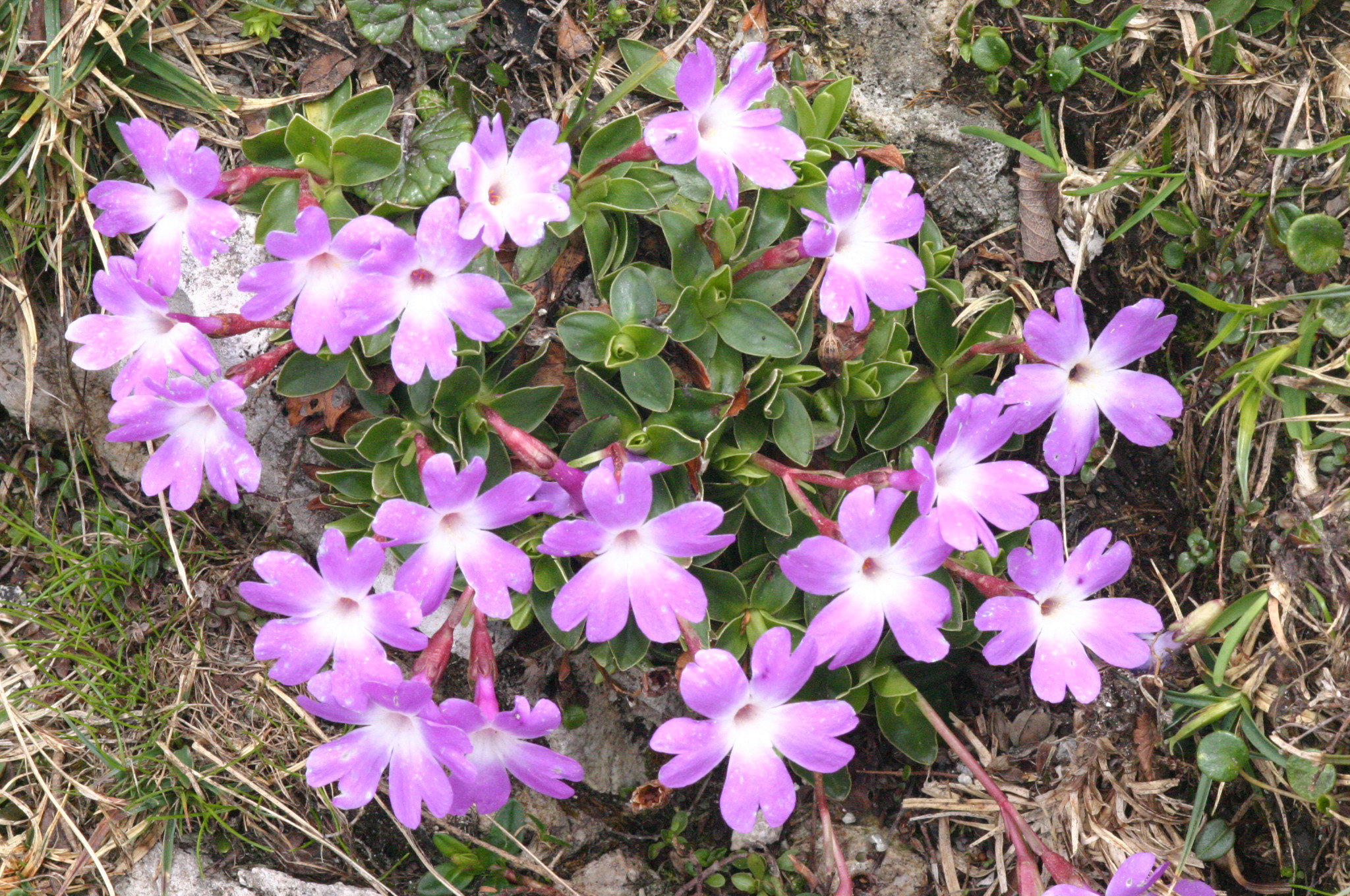

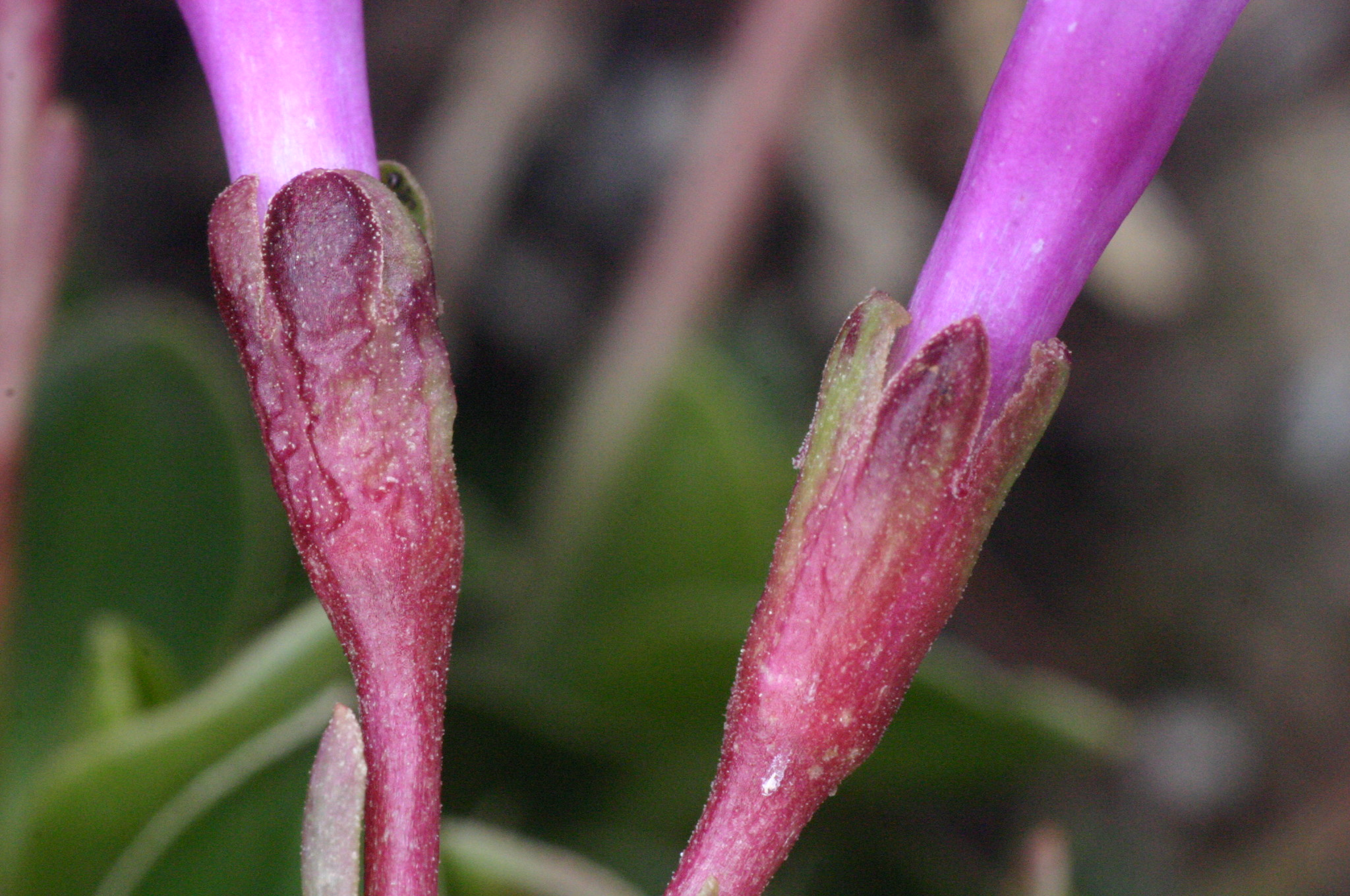

Scientific classification
- Kingdom: Plantae
- Clade: Tracheophytes
- Clade: Angiosperms
- Clade: Eudicots
- Clade: Asterids
- Order: Ericales
- Family: Primulaceae
- Genus: Primula
- Species: P. wulfeniana

Binomial name
- Primula wulfeniana Schott

Synonyms
- List: Auricula-ursi wulfeniana (Schott)

= Primula wulfeniana =

Species of flowering plant

Primula wulfeniana, also known as Wulfen's primrose, is a species of flowering plant within the genus Primula and family Primulaceae.

== Description ==
Primula wulfeniana is a herbaceous perennial plant. The species is diploid, possessing a chromosome count of (2n = 66). The leaves of Primula wulfeniana are obovate to elliptic in shape, sharply acute at the tips, and possess a leathery texture with cartilaginous characteristics. They exhibit entire margins and have a dark green coloration on the upper surface, while appearing paler underneath. The average leaf size ranges from 1 to 4 cm (0.39 to 1.57 in) in length and 5 to 12 mm (0.20 to 0.47 in) in width. Apart from marginal glands, the leaves are devoid of hairs. The flowers of this plant display a reddish-lilac hue and feature a distinct white eye. They are funnel-shaped to flat and have a diameter of approximately 2 to 3 cm (0.79 to 1.18 in). Often, these flowers are nearly stemless. The calyx of the flower is egg-shaped and possesses blunt sepal-lobes. The petal lobes are strap-shaped and narrowly notched.

== Distribution and habitat ==
Primula wulfeniana is native to Europe, where it can be found within the countries of Austria, Italy, Romania and Slovenia. P. wulfeniana primarily grows within the subalpine and subarctic zone encompassing the Southeast Alps mountain range. The species habitat consists of rocky mountain slopes and limestone meadows where has been recorded growing at elevations of 1,800 to 2,100 meters (5,900 to 6,900 ft) above sea level.

== Subspecies ==
The following subspecies are recognised:

- Primula wulfeniana subsp. baumgarteniana (Degen & Moesz) Lüdi
- Primula wulfeniana subsp. wulfeniana
