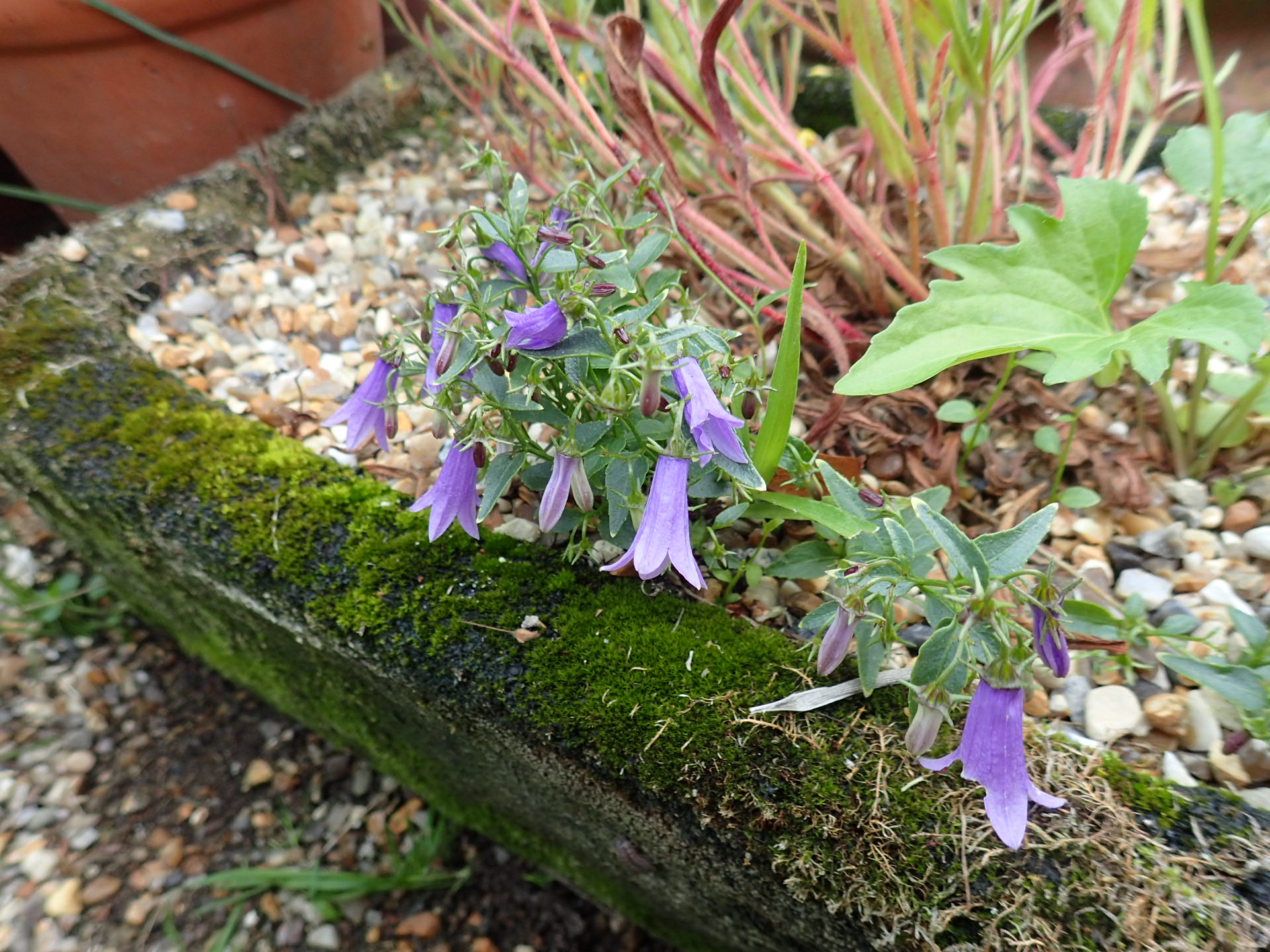

Scientific classification
- Kingdom: Plantae
- Clade: Tracheophytes
- Clade: Angiosperms
- Clade: Eudicots
- Clade: Asterids
- Order: Asterales
- Family: Campanulaceae
- Genus: Campanula
- Species: C. tommasiniana

Binomial name
- Campanula tommasiniana K.Koch

Synonyms
- Campanula waldsteiniana subsp. tommasiniana (K.Koch) Nyman

= Campanula tommasiniana =

Species of flowering plant

Campanula tommasiniana, known as the Croatian bellflower or Tommasini bell flower, is a perennial species of flowering plant in the family Campanulaceae. It is native to the alpine regions of Croatia. It has gained the Royal Horticultural Society's Award of Garden Merit as an ornamental.

== Etymology ==
The name "tommasiniana" refers to Muzio Giuseppe Spirito de Tommasini, a botanist who is renowned for his work on Dalmatian flora.

== Description ==
This plant is a compact, and forms in clumps up to 10 cm (3.9 in) tall.

Their dark-green leaves are said to be narrow, toothed and lance-shaped. Their flowers are bell-shaped and violet and can grow up to 2 cm (0.79 in) in length.

== Cultivation ==
They prefer to grow in loam, moist and well-drained soil under direct sunlight. They bloom in the summertime. During spring or summer, they can be propagated with cuttings. They are not suited to be indoor plants.

=== Pests ===
They may be affect by vine weevils, slugs and snails.
