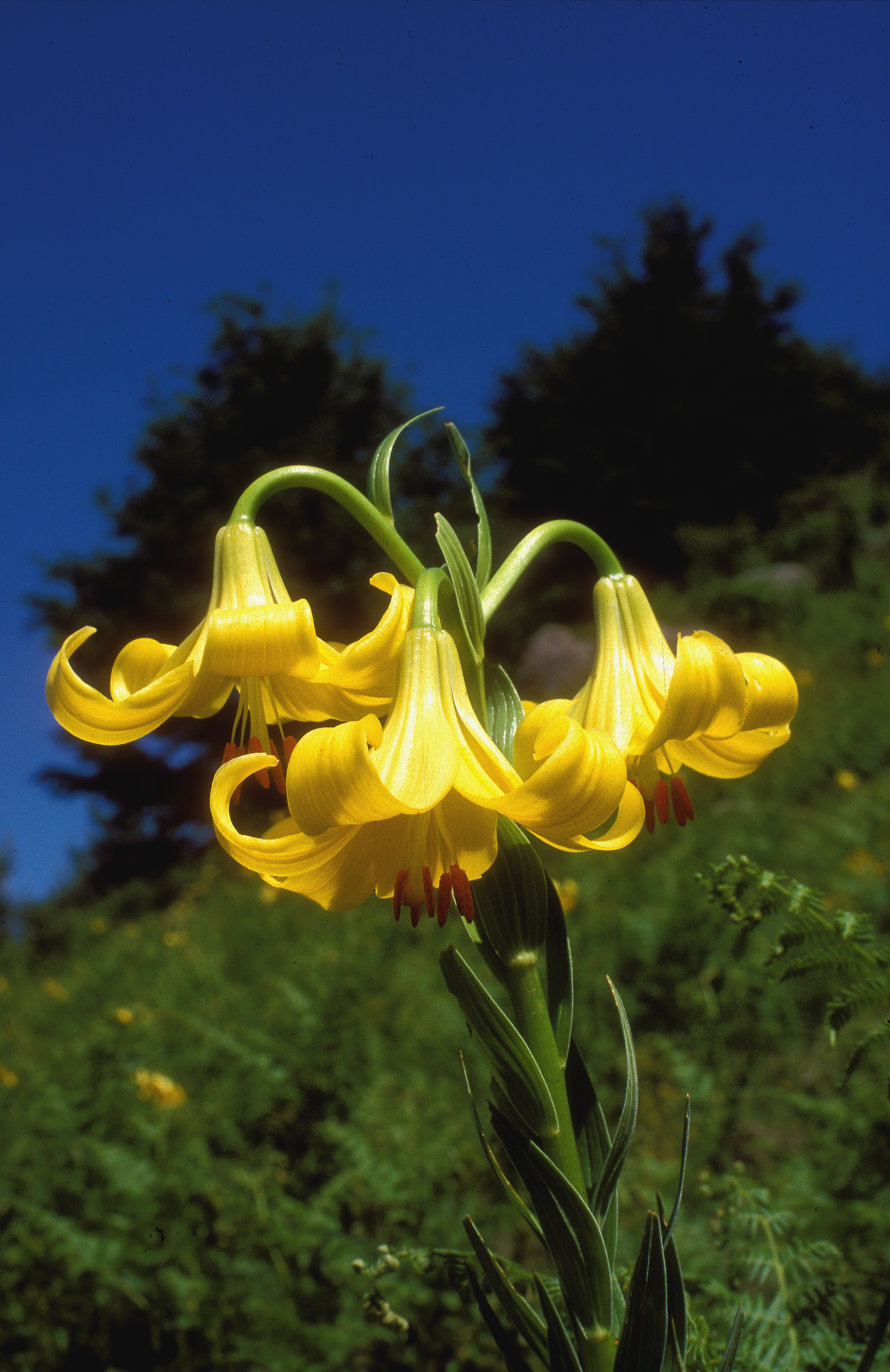
- Flower of L. rhodopeum

Scientific classification
- Kingdom: Plantae
- Clade: Tracheophytes
- Clade: Angiosperms
- Clade: Monocots
- Order: Liliales
- Family: Liliaceae
- Subfamily: Lilioideae
- Tribe: Lilieae
- Genus: Lilium
- Species: L. rhodopeum

Binomial name
- Lilium rhodopeum Delip., (1952)

= Lilium rhodopeum =

Species of lily

Lilium rhodopeum is a European species of plants in the lily family. It is endemic to the Rhodopi Mountains of Bulgaria and Greece, where it is found in alpine meadows and on mountain slopes. It is as critically endangered and listed as an IUCN (International Union for Conservation of Nature) red list threatened species. This Balkan endemic can be found in Bulgaria and Greece where it is native to the Rhodopi mountains from which it takes it name.
