= Crocus cvijicii =

Conservation status
- Least Concern (IUCN 3.1)

Scientific classification
- Kingdom: Plantae
- Clade: Embryophytes
- Clade: Tracheophytes
- Clade: Angiosperms
- Clade: Monocots
- Order: Asparagales
- Family: Iridaceae
- Genus: Crocus
- Species: C. cvijicii

Binomial name
- Crocus cvijicii Košanin

Species of flowering plant

Crocus cvijicii is a species of flowering plant in the genus Crocus of the family Iridaceae. It is a cormous perennial native to North Macedonia, Montenegro, eastern Albania and northern Greece.
