= Ivan Urumov =

Bulgarian botanist (1856–1937)

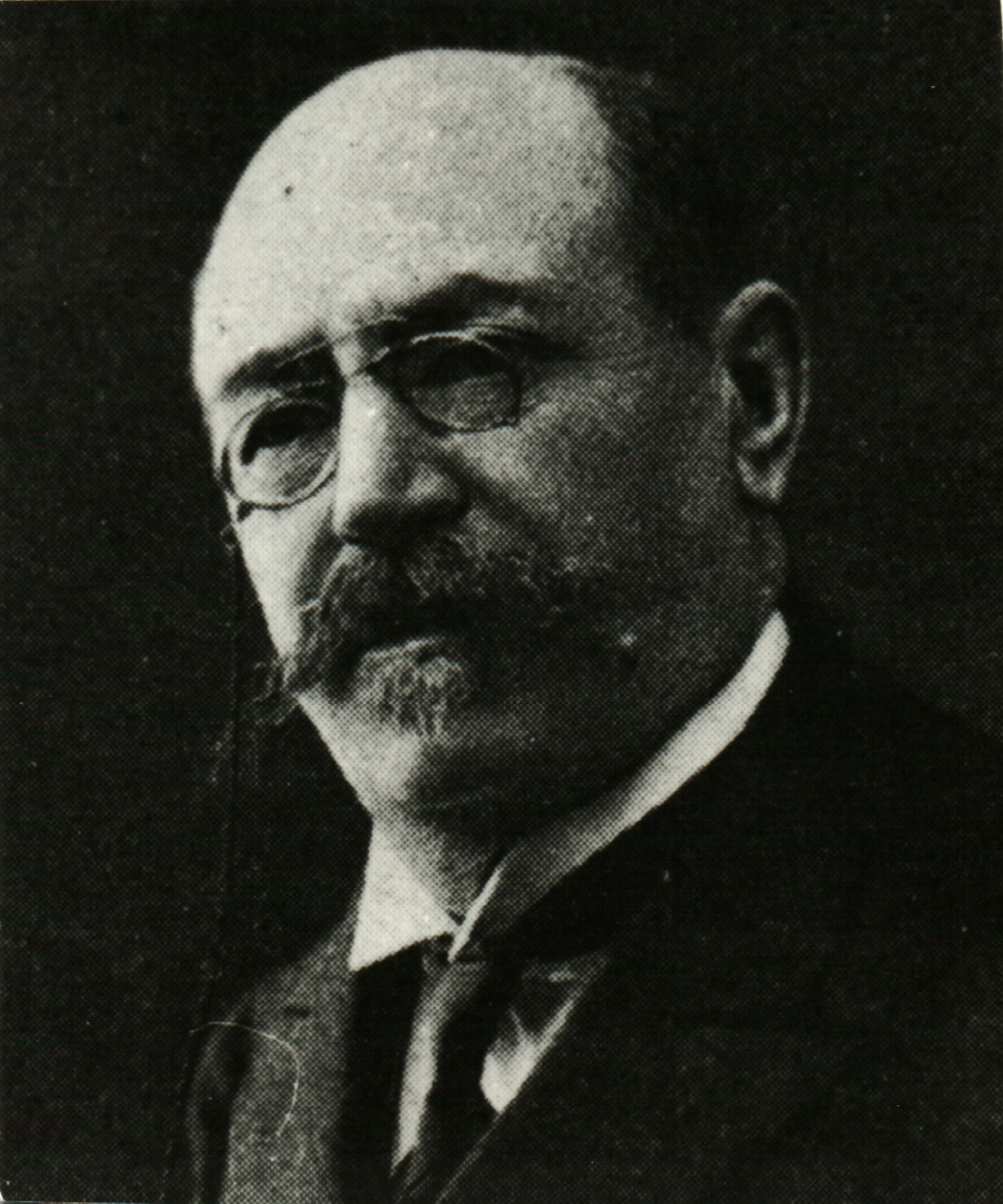
- Born: 10 May 1856; Lovech, Ottoman Bulgaria
- Died: 9 October 1937 (aged 81); Sofia, Kingdom of Bulgaria
- Citizenship: Bulgarian
- Education: Heidelberg University
- Scientific career
- Fields: botany
- Workplaces: Bulgarian Academy of Sciences

Ivan Kirov Urumov (Bulgarian: Иван Киров Урумов, sometimes transliterated as Ivan Kiroff Urumoff; 5 May 1856 – 9 October 1937) was a Bulgarian botanist, naturalist, teacher and a member of the Bulgarian Academy of Sciences.

== Biography ==
Ivan Urumov was born in the town of Lovech in Ottoman Bulgaria to a well-off family. He studied in Lovech, Gabrovo and Písek (Austria-Hungary) in the period 1873–1877. During and shortly after the Liberation of Bulgaria Ivan Urumov worked as a teacher in his home town (1877–1879). He then studied natural sciences in Vienna (1879–1880) and graduated in botany in at the Heidelberg University (1883–1885), where he prepared, but due to financial difficulties, did not defend a doctoral dissertation.

After returning to Bulgaria, he worked as teacher for 40 years in Lovech, Gabrovo, Ruse and Tarnovo. He was also school inspector in Lovech, Pleven and Tarnovo. Ivan Urumov authored the first Bulgarian textbooks on botany, zoology and mineralogy.

== Scientific contributions ==
Ivan Urumov systematically studied the Bulgarian flora and collected specimens of species unknown to science, as well as Bulgarian endemics. On his initiative, many Bulgarian teachers collected plants. Several plant species have been named after him, including Verbascum urumoffii, Oxytropis urumovii, Chondrilla urumoffii, Dianthus urumoffii, Tulipa urumoffii (currently recognized as a synonym of Tulipa hungarica) and Achillea urumoffii (currently recognized as a subspecies of Achillea kotschyi). The standard author abbreviation Urum. is used to indicate him as the author when citing a botanical name.

Urumov's main works are Contribution to the Bulgarian Flora and Materials on Bulgarian Folk Medicine.

He became a full member of the Bulgarian Academy of Sciences in 1904 and served as the Chairman of the Natural Sciences and Mathematics Division of BAS in 1924–1925. Ivan Urumov was one of the founders of the Bulgarian Botanical Society, established in 1923.

In addition, he was a member of the Initiative Scientific Committee for writing and printing the series Lovech and the Lovech Region, where he was the author of 17 articles on the topics of botany and history. He was the first to write the biographies of Vasil Radoslavov, Ivan Drasov and Marin Poplukanov. He donated personal funds for the publication of the series.

For his contribution to Bulgarian science, in 1936 Ivan Urumov was awarded the Order of Saint Alexander III grade, the second highest order of the Kingdom of Bulgaria.
