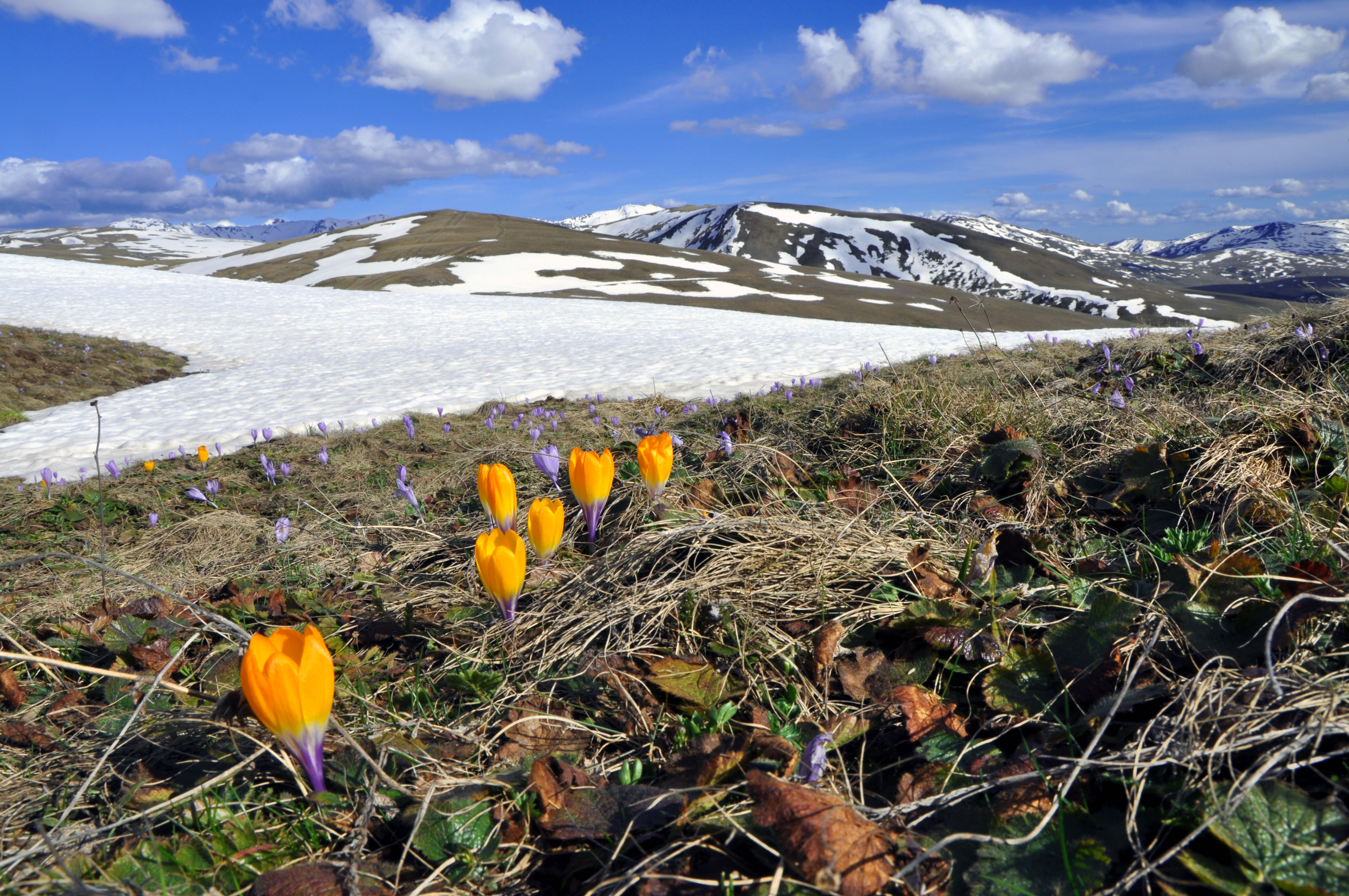
- In Kosovo

Scientific classification
- Kingdom: Plantae
- Clade: Tracheophytes
- Clade: Angiosperms
- Clade: Monocots
- Order: Asparagales
- Family: Iridaceae
- Genus: Crocus
- Species: C. scardicus

Binomial name
- Crocus scardicus Košanin

= Crocus scardicus =

Species of flowering plant

Crocus scardicus is a species of flowering plant in the genus Crocus of the family Iridaceae. It is a cormous perennial native to eastern Albania (Korab Mountains), Kosovo and North Macedonia.

Found growing from 1700 to 2500 meters, flowering occurs from May to July and it is often found blooming near patches of snow.
