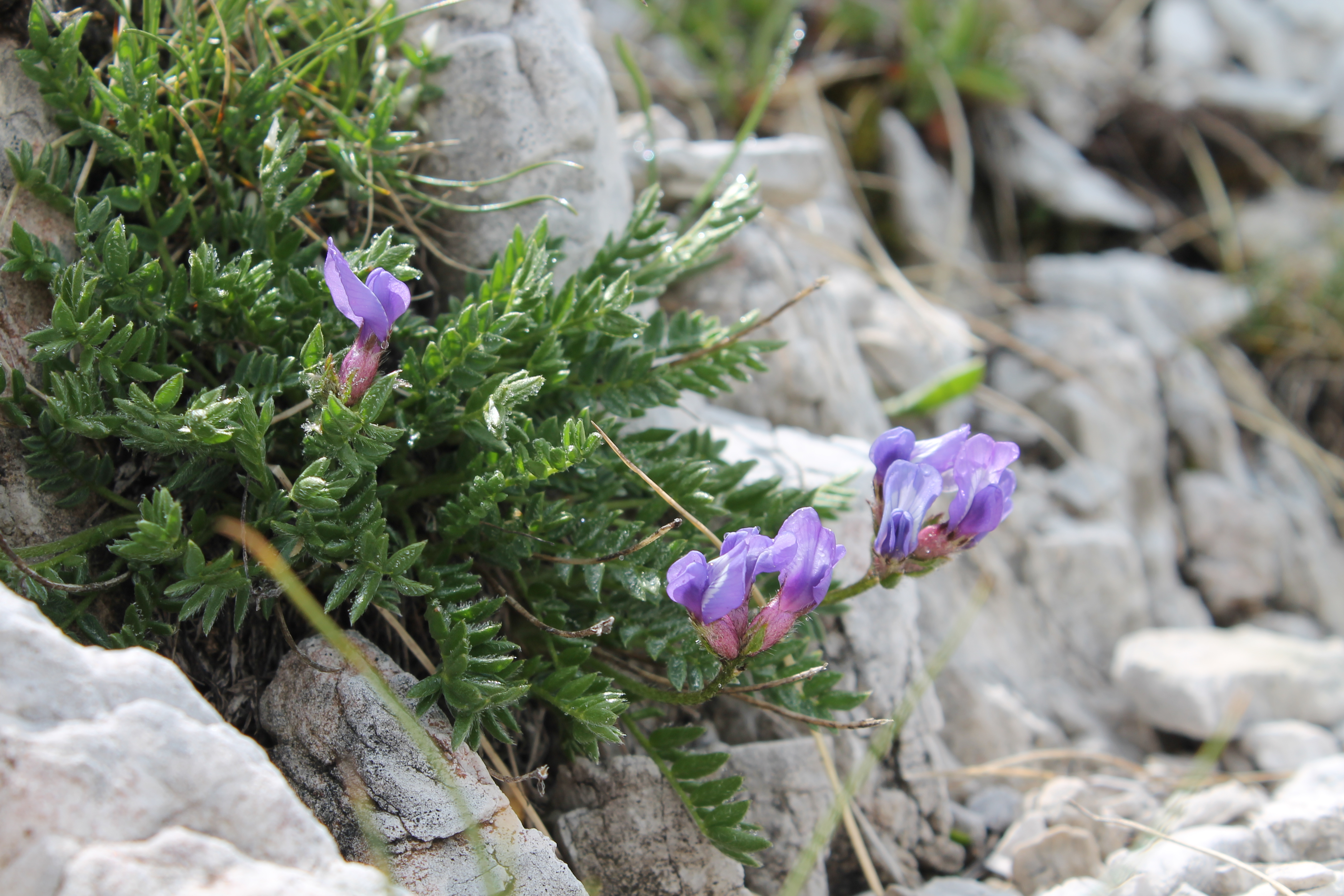

Scientific classification
- Kingdom: Plantae
- Clade: Tracheophytes
- Clade: Angiosperms
- Clade: Eudicots
- Clade: Rosids
- Order: Fabales
- Family: Fabaceae
- Subfamily: Faboideae
- Genus: Oxytropis
- Species: O. prenja

Binomial name
- Oxytropis prenja (G. Beck) G. Beck in Reichenb. & Reichenb. Fil

= Oxytropis prenja =

Species of flowering plant

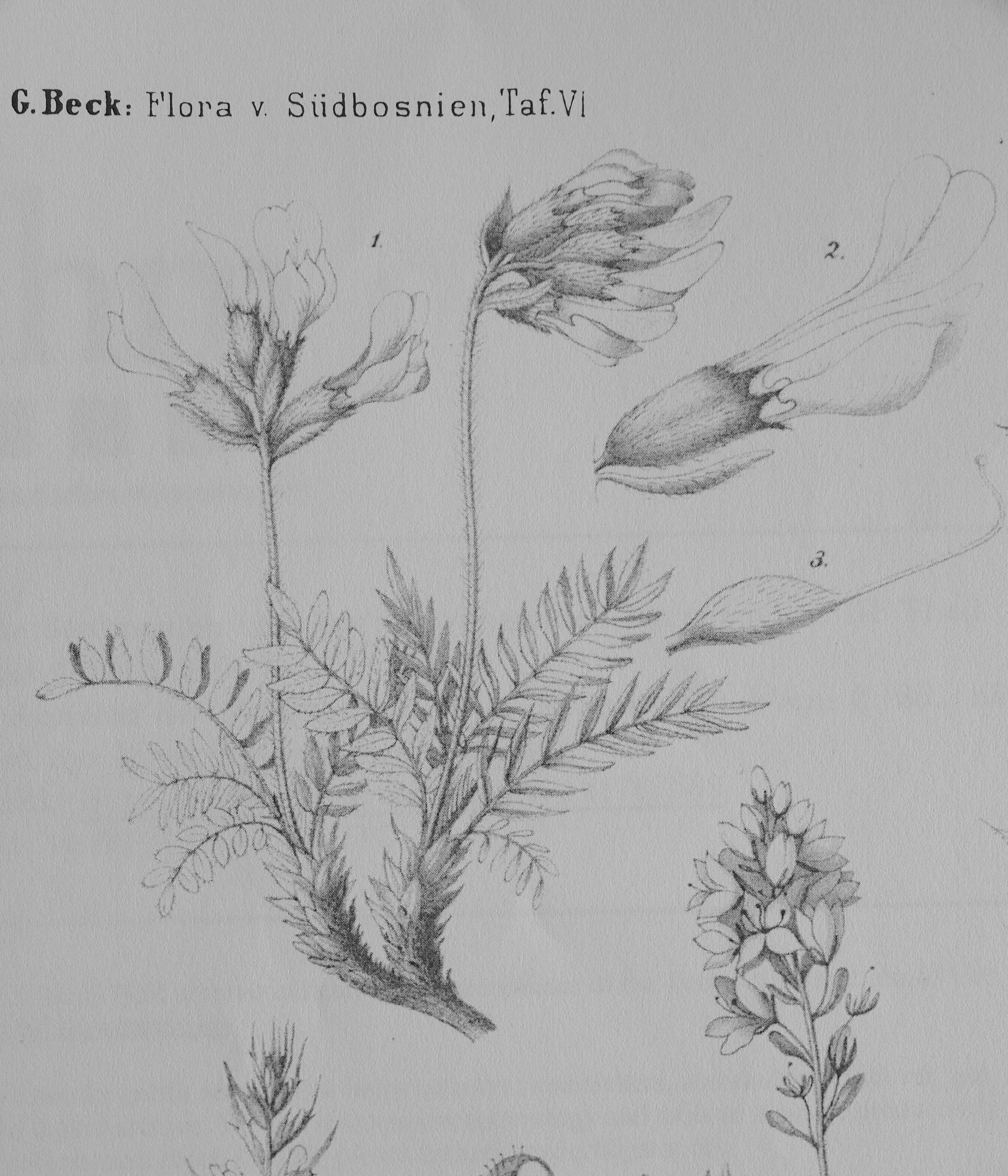
Beck's illustration in the diagnosis of Oxytropis prenja, 1891

Oxytropis prenja (G. Beck) G. Beck in Reichenb. & Reichenb. Fil. (synonyms: O. halleri Bunge ex Koch var. prenja G. Beck, in Bosnian Prenjska osivnica (Prenj's locoweed) or Prenjska oštrica) is a species of flowering plant in the legume family, Fabaceae.

== Description ==
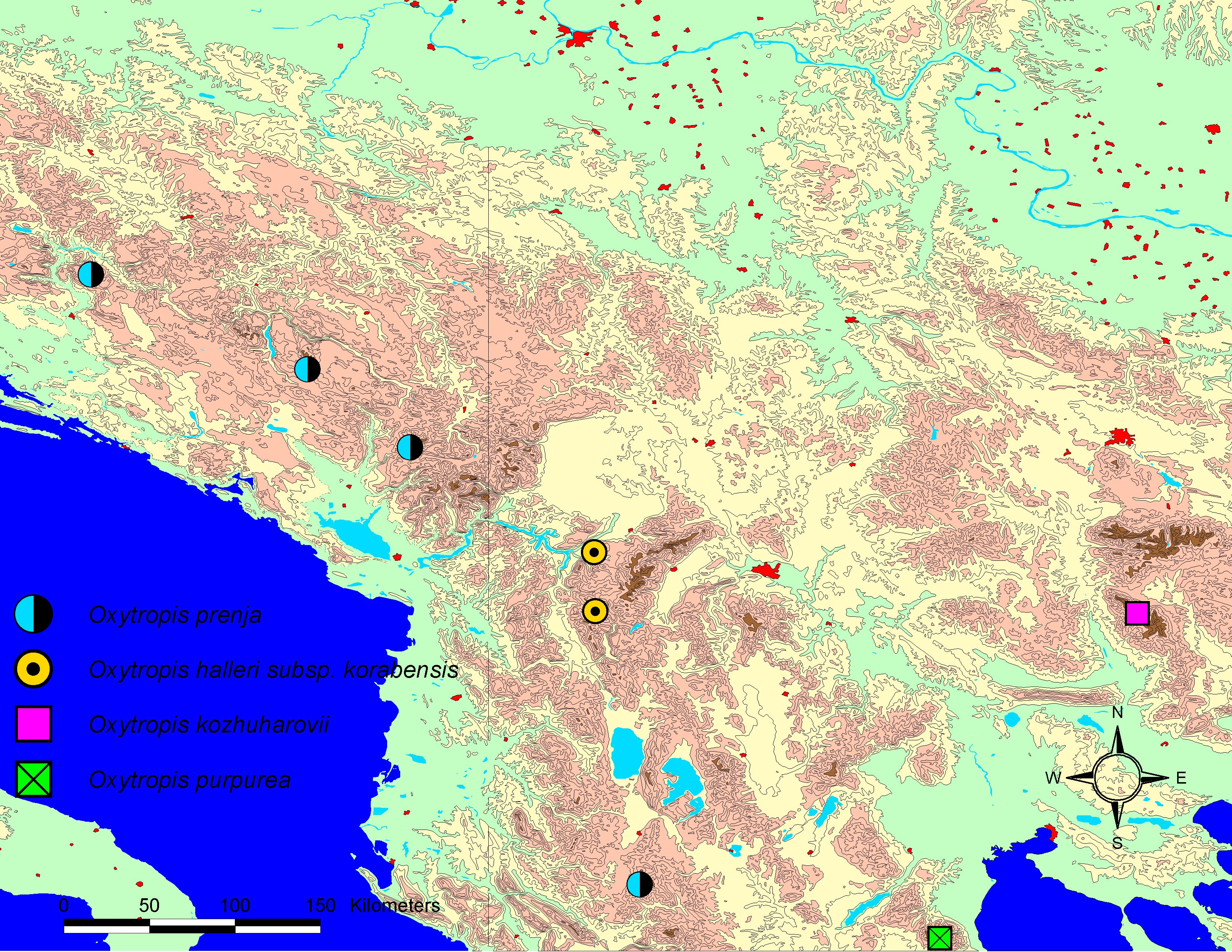
Distribution of Oxytropis prenja

Oxytropis prenja is a long-standing turf plant with a fully shortened stem, up to around (4-) 5–10 cm. Root it is strong, thick and branched, deeply penetrating into the substrate. Its shoots are upright, covered by attached white and black hairs. Leaves these form dense rosette. They are plumose, with short stem. It consists (5), 6-7 (-9) pairs of leaves, about 8 mm long, and 4–5 mm wide. The leaves are ovate to lancet, at the bottom of a rounded, sitting, and pointed at the top; both of sides are covered with long white flattened hairs, around the perimeter light inwards, and twisted edge.

The plantblossoms in July. Vertical cluster is a compact head, which is formed by many flowers, where the blossom stalk is longer than the list in which the armpit. Individual flowers are 15–20 mm long, or sitting on a short stalk. The cup is a tubular-bell, the outside covered with long, more or less protruding white hair and short black flattened hair. Calyx teeth are narrowly triangular, long around 3 mm, and 3,5-4 times shorter than tube. Naked crown is purple-blue. Bracts are elongated lanceolate, about the same length we say and a calyx, and unjustly; it has black and white attached hairs.

Fruita are elongated ovoid and very swollen light pods, about 14–18 mm long that suddenly narrows in long, outwardly curved, beak. It is densely covered with long flattened white and black hairs. It opens along the belly seam, in the upper third of the legume. The seeds are kidney.

== Ecology and distribution ==
The plant is growing in the highest band of Herzegovinian high mountains, built of limestone rocks, at altitudes around 1900–2220 m. It is overwhelming the mountain heliophyte.

Oxytropis prenja is endemic of Dinaric mountains in Hercegovina: Prenj, Čvrsnica, and Vran.

Locus classicus is Hercegovina: Prenj (name!) (Beck, G. 1887).

== See also ==
- List of Balkan endemic plants
