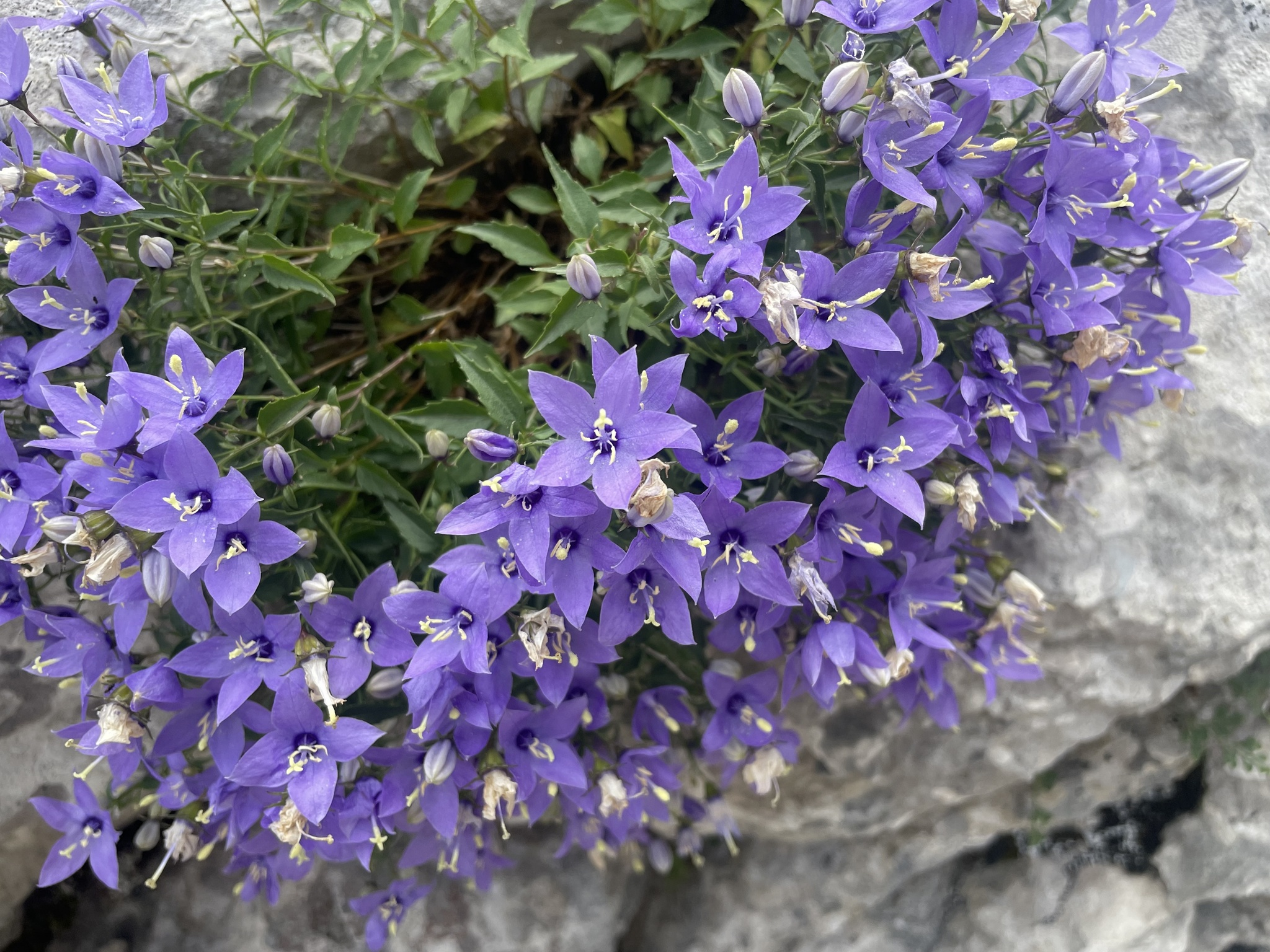
- C. waldsteiniana in the Velebit region

Scientific classification
- Kingdom: Plantae
- Clade: Tracheophytes
- Clade: Angiosperms
- Clade: Eudicots
- Clade: Asterids
- Order: Asterales
- Family: Campanulaceae
- Genus: Campanula
- Species: C. waldsteiniana

Binomial name
- Campanula waldsteiniana Schult.
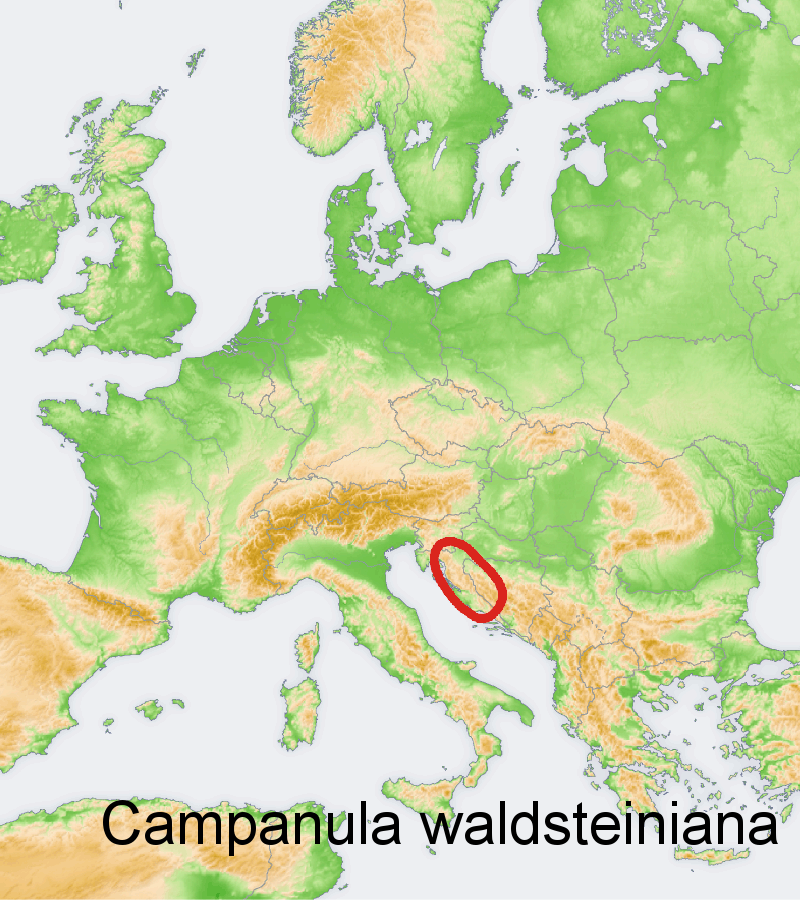

= Campanula waldsteiniana =

Species of flowering plant

Campanula waldsteiniana, the Waldstein bellflower, is a flowering plant species in the family Campanulaceae. It is a perennial or subshrub and grows primarily in the temperate area, within its native range in Croatia and Bosnia and Herzegovina. In 2006, the species was recorded in Mount Snežnik, Slovenia, which represents the northwesternmost locality in its current distribution area.
