= Carex riloensis =

Scientific classification
- Kingdom: Plantae
- Clade: Tracheophytes
- Clade: Angiosperms
- Clade: Monocots
- Clade: Commelinids
- Order: Poales
- Family: Cyperaceae
- Genus: Carex
- Species: C. riloensis

Binomial name
- Carex riloensis Stoeva & E.D.Popova

Species of flowering plant

Carex riloensis is a species of sedge in the family Cyperaceae, native to the Rhodope Mountains of Bulgaria. Its chromosome number is 2n = 26.
