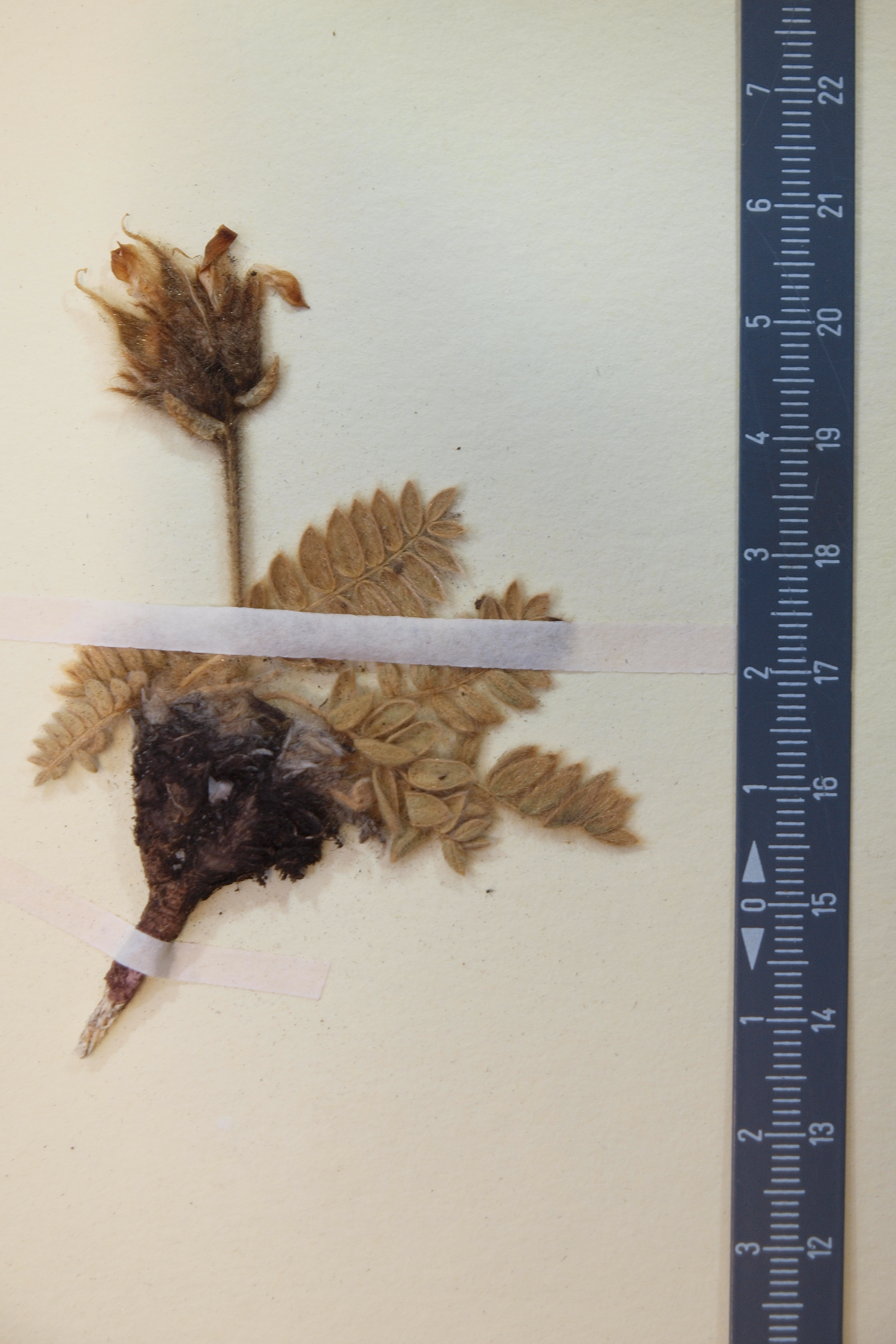

Conservation status
- Vulnerable (IUCN 3.1)

Scientific classification
- Kingdom: Plantae
- Clade: Tracheophytes
- Clade: Angiosperms
- Clade: Eudicots
- Clade: Rosids
- Order: Fabales
- Family: Fabaceae
- Subfamily: Faboideae
- Genus: Oxytropis
- Species: O. urumovii

Binomial name
- Oxytropis urumovii Jáv

= Oxytropis urumovii =

Species of flowering plant

Oxytropis urumovii is a species of flowering plant in the legume family endemic to Bulgaria, where it is restricted to the Pirin mountain range. There, it is found at altitudes of 2,500–2,800 m in the cirques of Malkia and Golemiya Kazan and the summits of Vihren (2,914 m), Banski Suhodol (2,884 m), Razlozhki Suhodol (2,728 m) and Kamenititsa (2,726 m) in the protected areas of Pirin National Park and Bayuvi Dupki–Dzhindzhiritsa Nature Reserve.

Oxytropis urumovii is distinctive compared to the other Balkan species of Oxytropis, with a semi-bilocular or almost completely bilocular legume. The plant, including the fruit, is densely covered with 2–3 mm patent whitish hairs. Amongst the European species of Oxytropis, Oxytropis urumovii is diagnosed by being acaulescent, having leaves with about eight pairs of leaflets, calyx-teeth which are much shorter than the tube, yellowish flowers and an ovoid semi-bilocular legume. It is distinguished from the more widespread Oxytropis campestris, with which it shares the same habitat, by the much longer, denser and generally patent indumentum.

It grows on marble rocks with shallow humus-carbonate soils on eastern and northwestern slopes. It is found in grassy alpine meadow communities with species, such as Festuca pirinica, Onobrychis scardica, Saxifraga ferdinandi-coburgi, Carum graecum, Achillea ageratifolia, Campanula velebitica, Thymus perinicus, Centaurea achtarovii, etc.

The species of named after the Bulgarian botanist Ivan Urumov.
