= Asperula hercegovina =

Scientific classification
- Kingdom: Plantae
- Clade: Tracheophytes
- Clade: Angiosperms
- Clade: Eudicots
- Clade: Asterids
- Order: Gentianales
- Family: Rubiaceae
- Genus: Asperula
- Species: A. hercegovina

Binomial name
- Asperula hercegovina (A.Degen) 1886

Synonyms
- A. hexaphylla, Beck, non All., A. capitata, Kit., Schultes subsp. hercegovina (Degen) Hayek

Species of flowering plant

Asperula hercegovina, commonly known as the Hercegovinian woodruff (in Bosnian, hercegovačka lazarkinja), is a herb endemic to Bosnia and Herzegovina of the Rubiaceae family.

== Description ==
This species is a perennial herb. It tends to reach about 10–20 cm tall and can be smooth or hairy. Its leaves occur in apparent whorls, with a length of roughly 13–25 cm and a width of about 1.5–2 (rarely 3) mm wide. Leaves are linear–lanceolate, smooth or hairy, with rough edges and are longer than internodia. They have 6–12 involucral ballots that are 4–5 mm long and 2–4 mm wide. The shape of their lanceolate is egg-shaped or oval.

It blooms in July and August. Flowers are in pseudoumbellated inflorescences, which are composed of 25–30 flowers. The crown is in four parts, with a length of 3–5 mm; it is white to pink. The flower has a funnel-shaped corolla with clearly developed, 3–4 mm long tube and a circumference is divided into 4 lobules 1.5–2.5 mm in length. The laps of these flower cups are poorly developed. The stigma is a two-part and more than crowns. The fruit is about 1.5 mm long and hairless.

One variety of this species has been described: A. hercegovina. var. Prodani Degen, whose members are mostly hairy: stem, leaves, bracts and crown.

== Distribution and habitat ==
The most common habitat for these plants is cracked limestone rocks, at an altitude of about 1,500 m, but more frequently from 1,700 to 2,000 and up to 2,100 m.

This plant species is endemic to the Central Dinaric Alps of Bosnia & Herzegovina, being found in mountains of both Bosnia (Bjelašnica, Hranisava and Vlahinja) and Herzegovina (Čabulja, Čvrsnica, Velež, Prenj and Plasa). It has also been found in Mt Durmitor, Montenegro, making it the first observation of Asperula hercegovina outside of Bosnia and Herzegovina.
