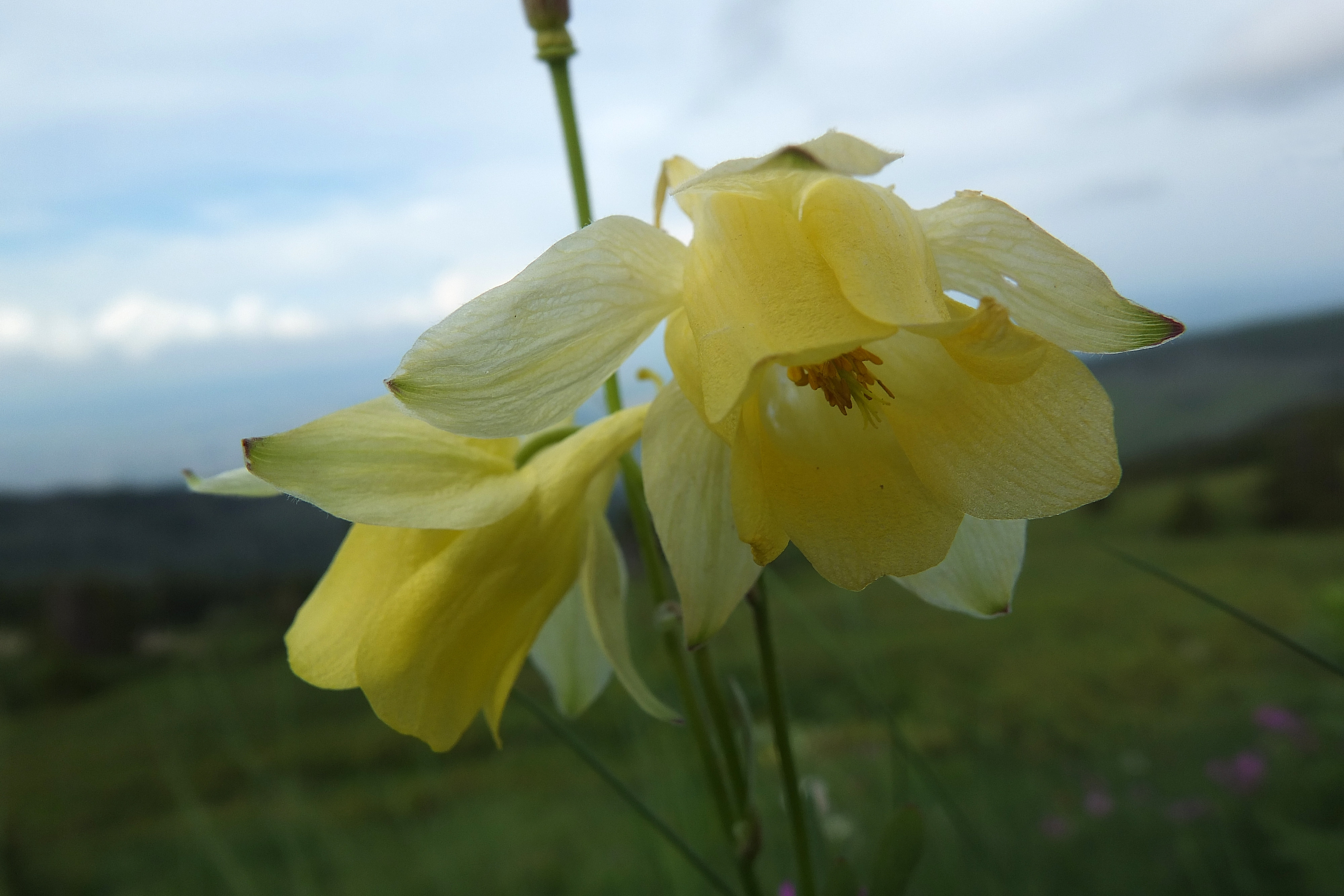
- Flower of Aquilegia aurea at Bistrishko Branishte reserve in Bulgaria

Scientific classification
- Kingdom: Plantae
- Clade: Tracheophytes
- Clade: Angiosperms
- Clade: Eudicots
- Order: Ranunculales
- Family: Ranunculaceae
- Genus: Aquilegia
- Species: A. aurea

Binomial name
- Aquilegia aurea Janka
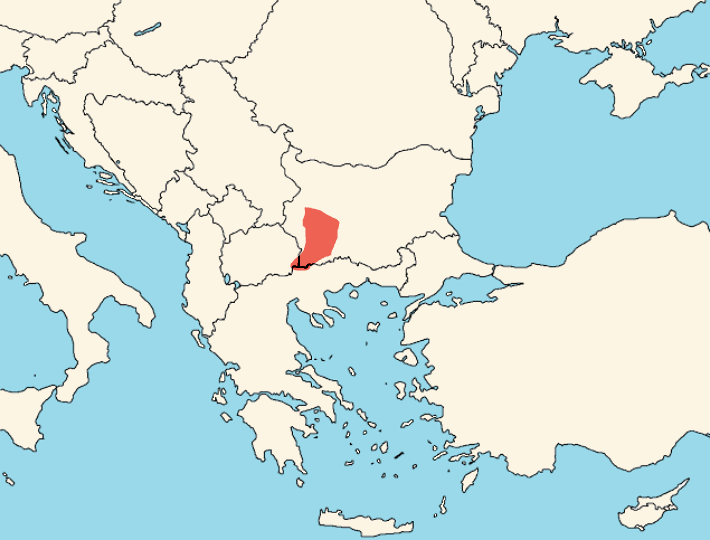
- Approximate distribution of Aquilegia aurea in southeastern Europe

Synonyms
- Aquilegia chrysantha var. aurea (Janka) K.C.Davis; Aquilegia sulphurea Zimmeter; Aquilegia vulgaris var. sulphurea Brühl

= Aquilegia aurea =

Species of flowering plant

Aquilegia aurea is a perennial flowering plant in the family Ranunculaceae native to Bulgaria and small areas of North Macedonia and Greece.

== Description ==
Aquilegia aurea grows to 10–100 cm (4–39 in) with smooth or lightly hairy stems and large, nodding, light yellow or greenish-yellow flowers with a hooked nectar spur and protruding stamens. It forms a large underground mass to maintain stability among the loose rocks and scree of its environment.

== Taxonomy ==
Aquilegia aurea belongs to a clade containing most of the European columbine species, which appear to have diverged from their closest relatives in Asia in the early Pleistocene, a little over 2 million years ago.

=== Etymology ===
The specific epithet aurea means "golden" in Latin, referring to the colour of the flowers.

== Distribution and habitat ==
Aquilegia aurea is native to mountainous regions of western and southwestern Bulgaria, in Vitosha, Rila, Pirin and the western Rhodope Mountains, as well as the Belasica mountains (also known as Kerkini in Greece) in southeastern North Macedonia and northeastern Greece. It grows in rocky alpine meadows at altitudes of 1,800–2,300 m (5,900–7,500 ft).

== Ecology ==
Aquilegia aurea blooms in June and July. It is one of the diagnostic species for the high-altitude Aquilegio aureae-Doronicetum columnae plant community that occurs in almost all of the main Bulgarian mountain ranges. The leaf miner Phytomyza minuscula is known to attack the leaves, along with the fungus Erysiphe aquilegiae var. aquilegiae, which causes powdery mildew, and the smut fungus Urocystis aquilegiae, which creates pustules on the leaves.

== Conservation ==
As of November 2024, the species has not been assessed for the IUCN Red List.
