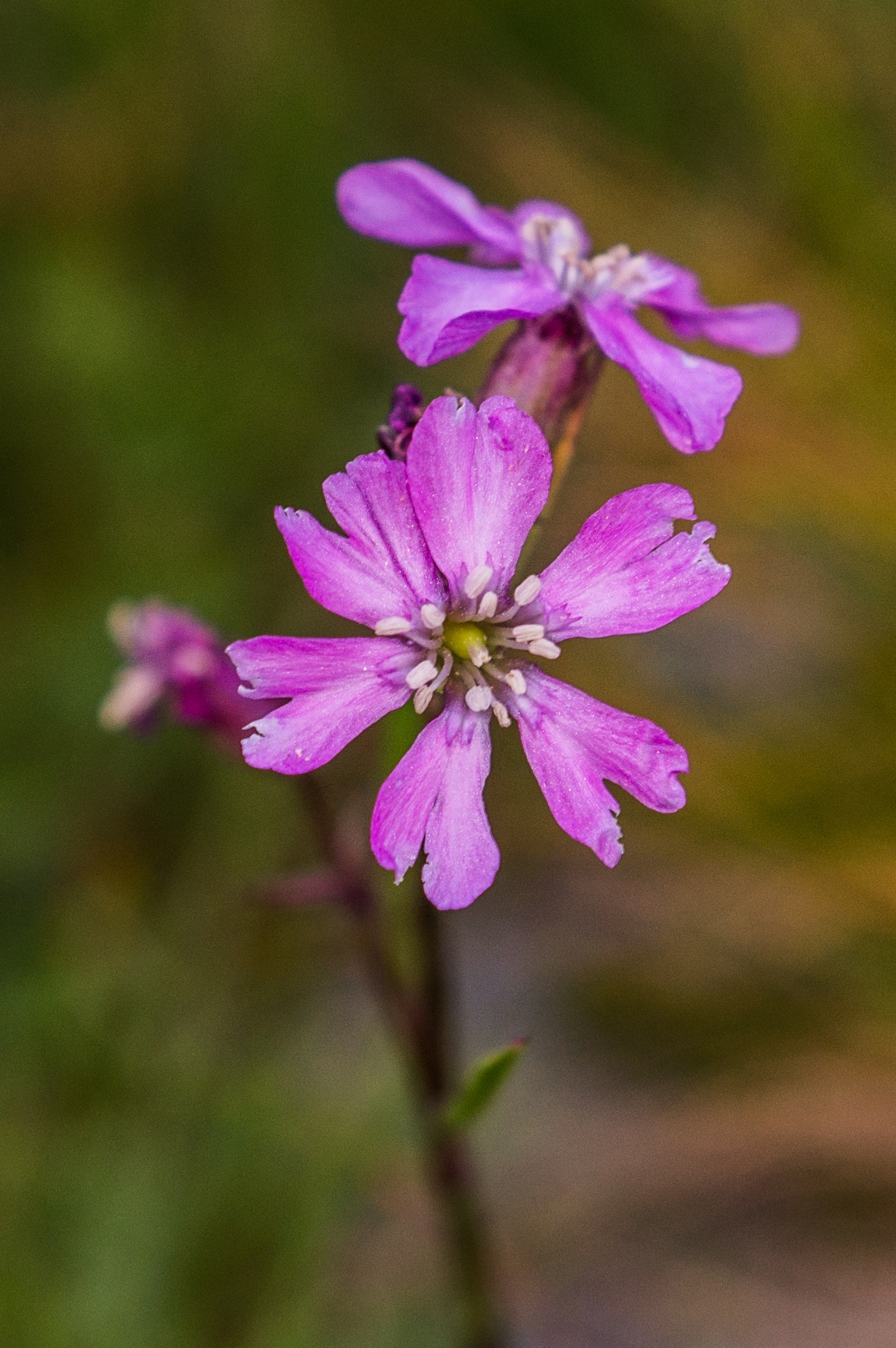

Scientific classification
- Kingdom: Plantae
- Clade: Tracheophytes
- Clade: Angiosperms
- Clade: Eudicots
- Order: Caryophyllales
- Family: Caryophyllaceae
- Genus: Silene
- Species: S. nivalis

Binomial name
- Silene nivalis (Kit.) Rohrb.

= Silene nivalis =

Species of flowering plant

Silene nivalis is a flowering plant in the pink family (Caryophyllaceae) native to Romania. A smut fungus, Microbotryum violaceum affects the anthers.
