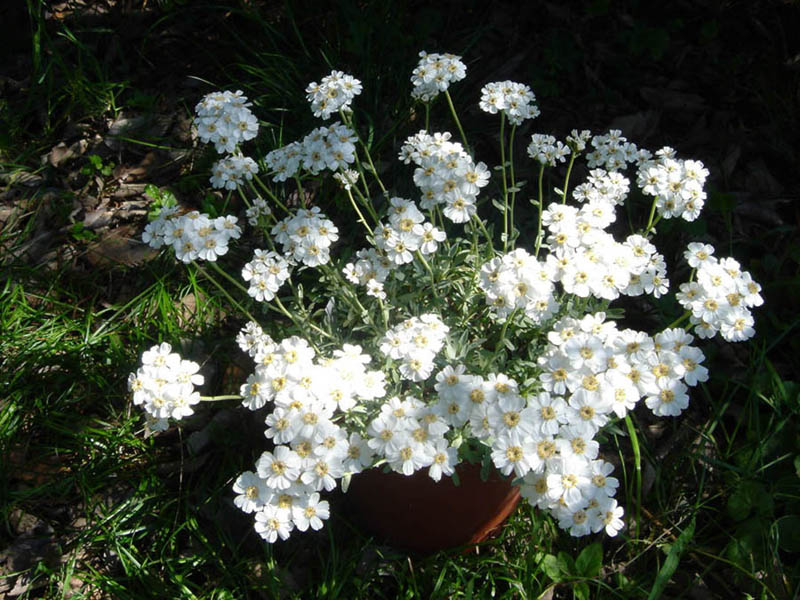

Scientific classification
- Kingdom: Plantae
- Clade: Tracheophytes
- Clade: Angiosperms
- Clade: Eudicots
- Clade: Asterids
- Order: Asterales
- Family: Asteraceae
- Genus: Achillea
- Species: A. ageratifolia

Binomial name
- Achillea ageratifolia (Sm.) Benth. & Hook.f.

Synonyms
- Anthemis ageratifolia Sm.; Ptarmica ageratifolia (Sm.) Nyman

= Achillea ageratifolia =

Species of yarrow

Achillea ageratifolia, the Balkan yarrow or Greek yarrow, is a species of flowering plant in the daisy family, Asteraceae.

== Description ==
Growing to 20 centimetres (8 in) tall and broad, it is a compact herbaceous perennial. It is a highly variable species, with three recognized subspecies. They have erect, simple, somewhat woody-based stems. The narrow grey-green foliage resembles that of a related genus Ageratum, hence the Latin specific epithet ageratifolia.

The solitary, daisy-like composite flower heads are white with yellow centres and about 2–3 cm across. They appear May–July in the Northern Hemisphere.

== Taxonomy ==
It was first described in 1813 as Anthemis ageratifolia by James Edward Smith in Florae Graecae, but in 1873 was transferred to the genus Achillea by George Bentham and Joseph Hooker.

The genus name refers to the Ancient Greek hero Achilles, who is said to have used yarrow leaves to stop his soldiers' wounds from bleeding. The specific epithet refers to similarity of the foliage to that of Ageratum.

== Distribution ==
It is native to Bulgaria and Greece.

== Cultivation ==
In cultivation in the UK, this plant has received the Royal Horticultural Society's Award of Garden Merit. An adaptable plant, it prefers a sunny, open position. It is hardy down to -10 to -15 degrees C. It is also drought tolerant and grows well in USDA hardiness zones 3–8. Common problems include aphids and downy mildew.
