= Petrus Maufer =

French printer of incunables

Petrus Maufer, also known as Pierre Maufer, Pietro Maufer, or Petrus Maufer de Maliferis, was a 15th-century French printer of incunables, who learned the trade together with Martin Morin when the family Lallemant from Rouen sent them to the Rhine region to learn about book printing. Instead of returning to Rouen with Morin, he travelled to Italy and became one of the earliest known printers in Padua, Verona, Venice and Modena.

== Known publications ==
=== Padua ===
- 1474: Pietro d'Abano. Liber Compilationis Phisonomiae
- 1474: Mondino de Liuzzi. Anatomia
- 1474: Simon de la Porte: Clavis sanationis
- 1474: Ps.-Lactantius Placidus, Narrationes fabularum Ovidianarum
- Before 1475: Matheolus Perusinus. De memoria
- 1476: Albertus Magnus. De mineralibus. Corr: Nicolaus de Pigaciis
- 1477: Gentile da Foligno. Commentary on Avicenna.
- 1478: Giles of Rome. Expositio super libros Analyticorum posteriorum Aristotelis
- 1479: Justinianus. Digestum novum
- 1480: Muhammad ibn Zakariya al-Razi. Liber nonus ad Almansorem

=== Verona ===
- 1480: Flavius Josephus e.a. De Bello Judaico and De Antiquitate Judaeorum Contra Apionem

=== Venice ===
- 1482: Bartolus de Saxoferrato. Codex
- 1486: Avicenna. Canon medicinae

=== Modena ===
- 1491: Bartholomaeus Socinus. Repetitio legis Gallus ff. de liberis et posthumis
- 1492: Johannes Lichtenberger. Pronosticatione in vulgare
- Johannes Baptista de Caccialupis. De debitoribus susceptis et fugitivis. De pactis. De Transactionibus
