= Aquilegia kubanica =

Scientific classification
- Kingdom: Plantae
- Clade: Tracheophytes
- Clade: Angiosperms
- Clade: Eudicots
- Order: Ranunculales
- Family: Ranunculaceae
- Genus: Aquilegia
- Species: A. kubanica

Binomial name
- Aquilegia kubanica I.M.Vassiljeva

Species of flowering plant

Aquilegia kubanica is a species of perennial flowering plant in the family Ranunculaceae. It is narrow-locally endemic to the northwestern Caucasus in Russia. The plant grows to between 25 cm (9.8 in) and 45 cm (18 in) tall. Its flowers are bicolor, with tepals that are blue-violet.

A. kubanica has an affinity towards Aquilegia olympica, with which it shares many similarities. The species was first described in 1991 by Mikhailovna Vassiljeva from two specimens, with its type specimen collected in 1968 near the river Kuban in the Karachay-Cherkess Autonomous Oblast (now part of Russia) by E. Gogina.

== Description ==
Aquilegia kubanica is a perennial member of the genus Aquilegia (columbines), which includes over 100 accepted species. The rootstock of A. kubanica plants can be either simple or branched. The species's rhizome is long and thick. Stems extending between 25 cm (9.8 in) and 45 cm (18 in) tall and possess glandular hairs above ground. There are typically one or two flowering stems. Some leaves are in a basal arrangement, protruding from the base of the stem. These leaves are numerous and biternate with petioles thinly covered with long hairs. Other leaves are on the middle of the stem, extending from short petioles. The leaflets are 3 cm (1.2 in) to 4 cm (1.6 in) long and wide.

In all species of Aquilegia, flowers are solitary on their branches. On each A. kubanica inflorescence, there are two to five flowers. They extend from brownish pubescent peduncles. The flowers on A. kubanica are relatively small and bicolor with sepals that are blue-violet. The sepals, which are 14 mm (0.55 in) and 18 mm (0.71 in) long and 8 mm (0.31 in) to 10 mm (0.39 in) wide, are ovate and come to a pointed tip. The petals are in the medium size range within the genus at 22 mm (0.87 in) to 40 mm (1.6 in) long. The rectangular petals of each flower form a homogenous cylindrical corolla. Nectary laminae are whitish-yellow. The nectar spurs range between 14 mm (0.55 in) and 18 mm (0.71 in) long. They are narrow and conical, protruding nearly straight before hooking near their slightly swelled terminus.

The plant fruits with five follicles that are not fused and diverge from a shared base. The follicles are relatively small, extending between 10 mm (0.39 in) and 15 mm (0.59 in) long. Immature seeds were observed to be reddish-brown and ribbed. The seeds are between 1.5 mm (0.059 in) and 2 mm (0.079 in) long.

A. kubanica possesses an affinity towards Aquilegia olympica, including in appearance. Differences include the size of the flowers – A. kubanica possessing the smaller of the two – and the color the anthers – A. kubanica's are yellow, while A. olympica's are brown. In A. kubanica, the seeds are shiny; those of A. olympica are matte.

== Taxonomy ==
Aquilegia kubanica was first described in 1991 by the Russian botanist Irina Mikhailovna Vassiljeva in the journal Botanicheskiĭ Zhurnal. A. kubanica possesses an affinity towards the species A. olympica, which has an extensive range that encompasses that of A. kubanica. The type specimen for A. kubanica was collected in 1968 from a scree along the upper reaches of the Kuban by E. Gogina. It – alongside a specimen in collected 1989 – was held in the Komarov Botanical Institute, Leningrad, as of 1991. Italian botanist Enio Nardi credited Vassiljeva and her 1992, 1996, and 2012 work as being solely responsible for the species being known.

A. kubanica is part of an expansive species complex led by Aquilegia olympica that contains the Caucasian Aquilegia with two-colored flowers. This range overlaps with the less prevalent and monochromatic Aquilegia gegica.

The species is accepted by several taxonomic authorities, including the Royal Botanic Gardens, Kew's The World Checklist of Vascular Plants and World Flora Online.

=== Etymology ===
The word columbine, the common name for species in the genus, derives from the Latin word columbinus, meaning "dove", a reference to the flowers' appearance being similar to a group of doves. The genus name Aquilegia may come from the Latin word for "eagle", aquila, in reference to the petals' resemblance to eagle talons. A more likely etymology for Aquilegia is a derivation from the Latin aquam legere "to collect water", aquilegium (a container of water), or aquilex ("dowser" or "water-finder") in reference to the profusion of nectar in the spurs. The specific name kubanica is Latin for Kuban, where the species was first collected.

== Distribution ==
Aquilegia kubanica is narrow-locally endemic to the northwestern Caucasus. It is the sole Caucasian Aquilegia to have a range exclusively within the continent of Europe. Upon its initial description, the species's range was indicated as along the upper reaches of the river Kuban in what was then the Karachay-Cherkess Autonomous Oblast of the Soviet Union. Three accepted species of Aquilegia in the Caucasus at the time of A. kubanica's description, only A. olympica has an extensive range, with Aquilegia gegica and Aquilegia colchica being endemic as with A. kubanica. The range was identified as inclusive of the Russian North Caucasus by the Italian botanist Enio Nardi in 2017.

The plant primarily populates places with temperate climates. A. kubanica has been found at an elevation of 1,400 m (4,600 ft). The plant is limited to the upper forest belt of mountains, differing from A. olympica's range in the alpine and subalpine belts.

=== Conservation ===
As of 2025, the Royal Botanic Gardens, Kew's Plants of the World Online predicted the extinction risk for A. kubanica as "threatened" with a confidence level of "confident".
