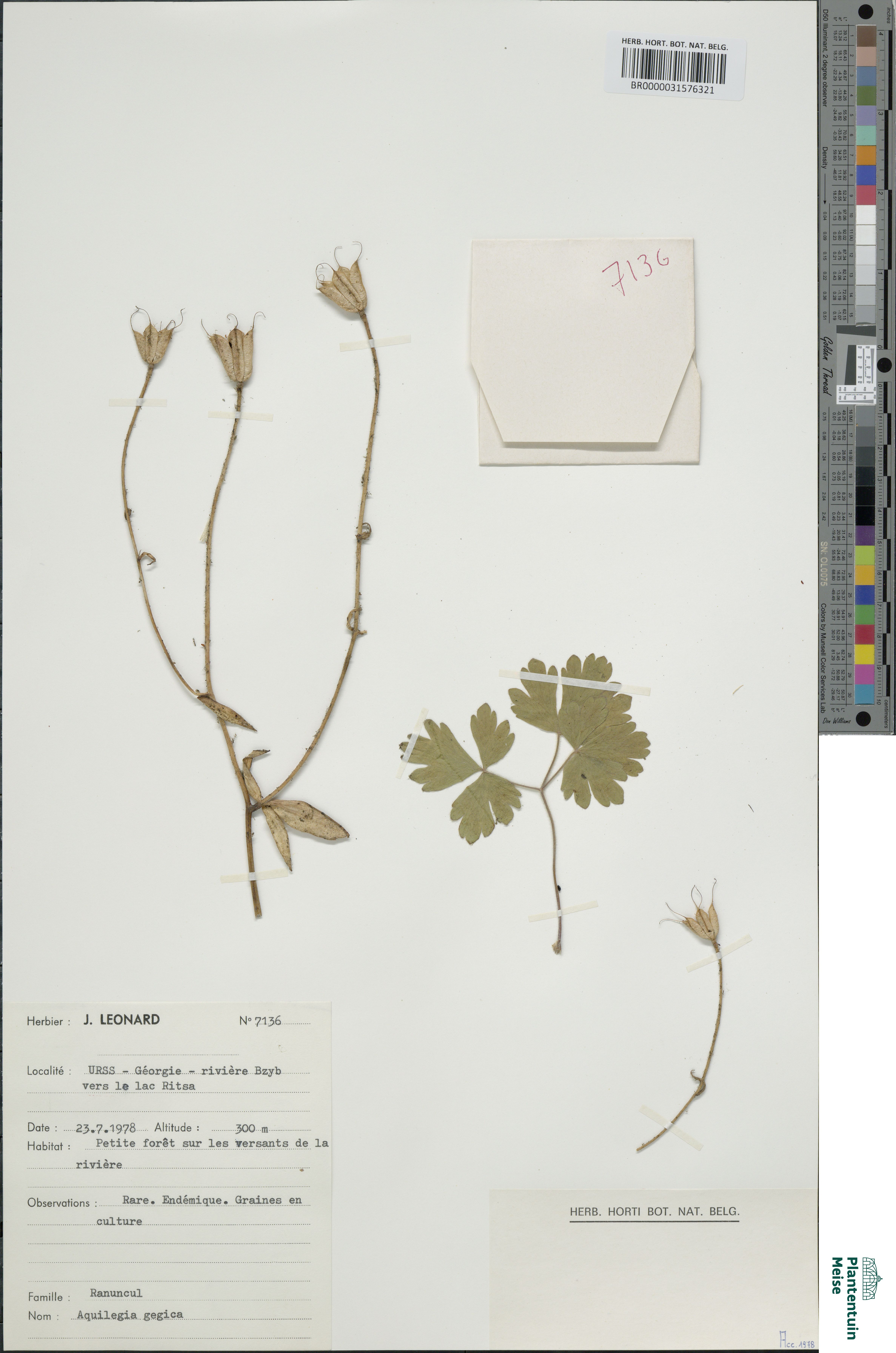
- Preserved specimen of Aquilegia gegica

Scientific classification
- Kingdom: Plantae
- Clade: Tracheophytes
- Clade: Angiosperms
- Clade: Eudicots
- Order: Ranunculales
- Family: Ranunculaceae
- Genus: Aquilegia
- Species: A. gegica

Binomial name
- Aquilegia gegica Jabr.-Kolak.

= Aquilegia gegica =

Species of flowering plant

Aquilegia gegica is a species of flowering plant in the genus Aquilegia (columbine) in the family Ranunculaceae endemic to the western South Caucasus region in Abkhazia and Georgia. The plant's flower petals are light blue.

== Description ==
Aquilegia gegica is a perennial herbaceous plant in the genus Aquilegia (columbines). The pubescence (coverage by small hairs) of the plant gives it a greyish appearance. Leaves on the lower portion of the stem are double trifoliate. There are leaves further up the stem.

The species produces flowers that are small for the genus, measuring between 30 mm (1.2 in) and 50 mm (2.0 in) in diameter. It has long petals that are light blue. The nectar spurs possess a funnel shape and transition from blue in the upper portion to whitish at the lower end. The plant prefers temperate environments.

== Taxonomy ==
Aquilegia gegica was received its binomial when it was first described in 1953 by Vitta Savelievna Jabrova-Kolakovskaja in the Zametki po Sistematike i Geografii Rastenii. The type locality for the species is Abkhazia, the valley the Gega river.

A. gegica is capable of producing fertile hybrid offspring with Aquilegia colchica, another Aquilegia species endemic to the western Caucasus.

== Distribution ==
It is native to the western Transaucasus region of the western Caucasus. The plant can be found in Abkhazia and Georgia. Like A. colchina and Aquilegia kubanica, A. gegica is endemic in the Caucasus; the only other Caucasian Aquilegia, Aquilegia olympica, has a substantially more expansive range.

== Conservation ==
As of 2024, the Royal Botanic Gardens, Kew, utilizing the Angiosperm Extinction Risk Predictions v1, predicts that Aquilegia gegica is a "threatened" species with a confidence level of "confident".

== Cultivation ==
Botanist Robert Nold, in his 2003 book Columbines, said that he was unaware of any information regarding A. gegica besides its appearance on a website dedicated to endangered plants from Georgia. The National Botanical Garden of Georgia has cultivated A. gegica derived from plants present on the Egrisi Ridge in the Chkhorotsqu Municipality in 2016.
