= Guido de Monte Rochen =

French priest and jurist

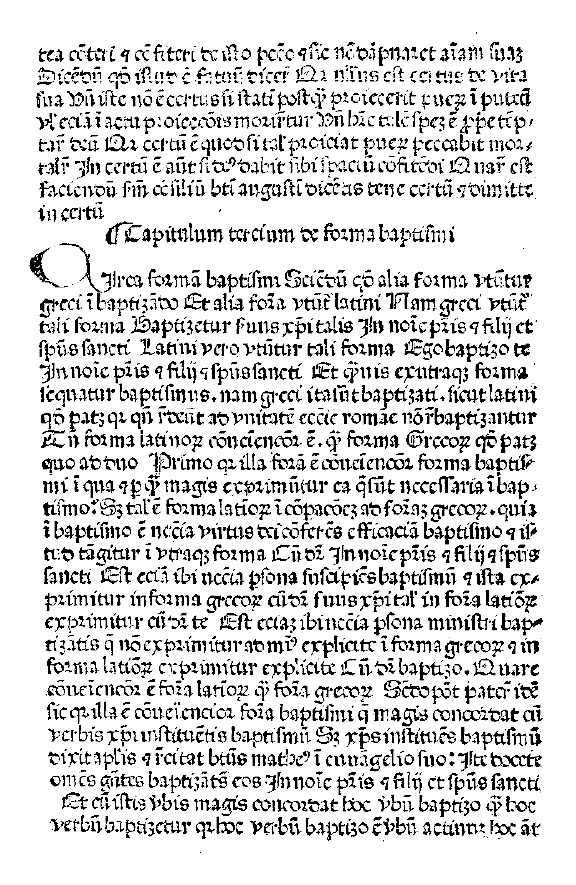
Page from a 1475 edition from Spain of the Manipulus curatorum.

Guido de Monte Rochen or Guy de Montrocher was a French priest and jurist who was active around 1331. He is best known as the author of Manipulus curatorum (the manual of the curate), a handbook for parish priests, that was often copied, with some 180 complete or partial manuscripts surviving, and later reprinted throughout Europe in the next 200 years, with at least 119 printings, and sales which have been estimated to be three times those of Thomas Aquinas' Summa Theologica. It became obsolete only when the Council of Trent created the Roman Catechism in 1566.

== Printings ==
=== Austria ===
- Printer of the 1482 'Vocabolista' (Stephan Koblinger?), Vienna, 1482

=== Belgium ===
- Johannes de Westfalia, Leuven, 1483
- Jean Beller, Antwerp, 1564

=== England ===
- Richard Pynson, about 1497 and 1500

There were five more English printings of this book before 1520, including three editions by Wynkyn de Worde (1502, 1509, and 1517).

=== France ===
- Petrus Caesaris, Paris, 1473 or 1474
- So-called Printer of Pius II, Albi, 1475
- "In vico S. Jacobi" (Au Soufflet Vert [Louis Symonel et Socii]), Paris, 1476 and 1479
- Johannes de La Tour (de Turre) and Johannes Morelli, Angers, 1477 and 1495
- Nicolaus Philippi, Lyon, about 1477, 1480, 1481 and 1488
- Ulrich Gering, Paris, 1478 and 1480
- Johannes Solidi (Schilling), Vienne, Isère, about 1478
- Jean Bouyer, Poitiers, between 1479 and 1490, and 1495
- Antoine Caillaut, Paris, 1482, 1483, 1490 and 1494
- Guy Marchant, Paris, 1483
- Guillaume Le Roy, Lyon, 1483, 1485 and 1487
- Printer of the 1481 'Legenda Aurea', Strassburg, 1483
- Henricus Mayer, Toulouse, 1484
- Pierre Levet, Paris, 1487, 1488, 1489
- Martin Flach, Strassburg, 1487, 1489, 1493 and 1499
- Philippe Pigouchet, Paris, 1489 and 1491
- Jean Du Pré, Lyon, 1490
- Mathieu Vivian, Orléans, 1490 or 1491
- Engelhardus Schultis, Lyon, about 1491
- Jean Le Bourgeois, Rouen, 1493, 1494, 1497, 1498 and 1499
- Félix Baligault, Paris, 1493
- Martin Morin, Rouen, 1494, 1495 and 1496
- Pierre Le Dru, Paris, 1494 and 1496
- Georg Mittelhus, Paris, 1494
- Jacques Le Forestier, Rouen, 1495 and 1497
- Janon Carcain, Lyon, about 1495
- Hémon David, Lyon, after 1495
- Michael Le Noir, Paris, 1496
- Mathieu Latheron, Tours, 1497
- Etienne Jehannot, Paris, 1497
- Michel Topié, Lyon, 1499
- Richard Auzoult, Rouen, 1500
- Jean de Vingle, Lyon, 1500

Later printings continue at least until the 1554 edition by Gulielmum Rouillium of Lyon.

=== Germany ===
- Printer of Lotharius (Conrad Mancz?), 1474 or earlier
- Bartholomaeus de Unkel, Cologne, 1476
- Conrad Winters, de Homborch, Cologne, 1478 and 1481
- Conrad Fyner, Esslingen am Neckar, about 1479
- Johann Guldenschaff, Cologne, 1480
- Christman Heyny, Augsburg, 1471 or 1481
- Heinrich Quentell, Cologne, about 1484-89, 1492 and 1498
- Johann Koelhoff, the Elder, Cologne, 1487

=== Italy ===
- Christophorus Beyamus and Johannes Glim, Savigliano, 1473 or earlier
- Johannes Reinhardi, Rome, 1476
- "In domo Francisci de Cinquinis", Rome, 1477
- Johannes Bulle, Rome, 1478
- Johannes de Nördlingen, Bologna, 1480
- Leonardus Pachel, Milan, 1481 and 1492
- Eucharius Silber, Rome, 1481 and 1485
- Andreas de Bonetis, Venice, 1483
- Stephan Plannck, Rome, 1484, 1490 and 1496
- Marinus Saracenus, Venice, 1486
- Johannes Antonius de Honate, Milan, about 1488-89
- Guilelmus Anima Mia, Tridinensis, Venice, 1489
- Maximus de Butricis, Venice, 1491
- Damianus de Mediolano, de Gorgonzola, Venice, 1493
- Simon Bevilaqua, Venice, 1495
- Christophorus de Pensis, de Mandello, Venice, 1498
- Johannes Baptista Sessa, Venice, 1500

=== Portugal ===
- German Gallarde, Lisbon, 1523

=== Spain ===
- Mathaeus Flander (of Flanders), Zaragoza, 1475
- Nicolaus Spindeler, Barcelona, 1479
- Nicolaus Spindeler, Tarragona, 1484
- Juan de Brocar, Alcalá de Henares, 1545
- Pedro de Castro, Salamanca, 1550

=== Switzerland ===
- Martin Flach, Basel, about 1478
- Adam Steinschaber, Geneva, 1480
- Michael Wenssler, Basel, about 1485
- Louis Cruse, Geneva, 1487
