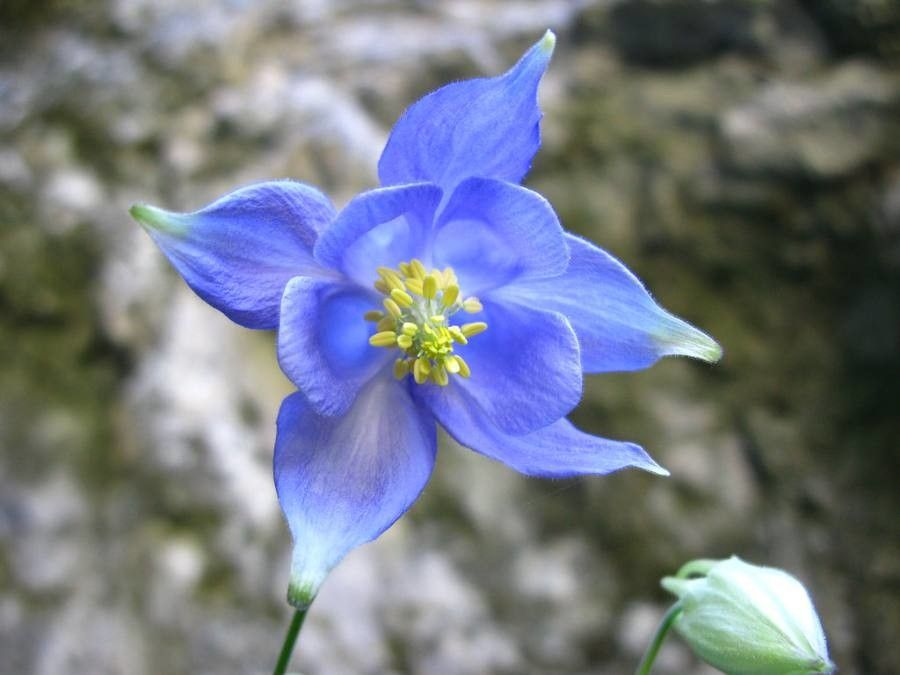
- Flower

Conservation status
- Not evaluated (IUCN 3.1)

Scientific classification
- Kingdom: Plantae
- Clade: Tracheophytes
- Clade: Angiosperms
- Clade: Eudicots
- Order: Ranunculales
- Family: Ranunculaceae
- Genus: Aquilegia
- Species: A. champagnatii

Binomial name
- Aquilegia champagnatii Moraldo, Nardi & la Valva
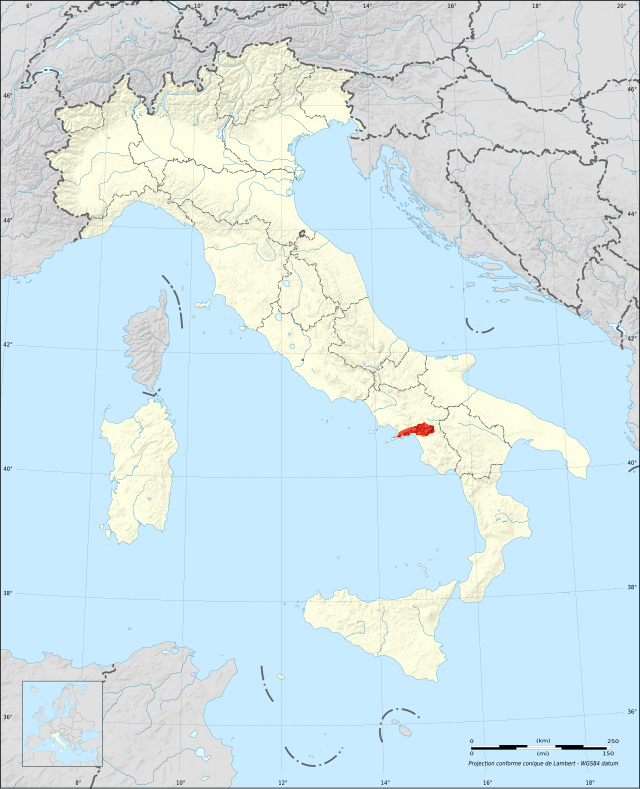
- Distribution of Aquilegia champagnatii in Italy

Synonyms
- Aquilegia ottonis subsp. speluncarum (Lacaita) Del Guacchio; Aquilegia vulgaris var. speluncarum Lacaita

= Aquilegia champagnatii =

Species of flowering plant

Aquilegia champagnatii is a perennial species of flowering plant in the family Ranunculaceae, native to Italy.

== Description ==
Aquilegia champagnatii grows to 30–40 cm (12–16 in) tall and has large, nodding, pale blue flowers with curved spurs. The basal leaves can be smooth or hairy and are biternate in form. The rhizome is slender and creeping, with notable remnants of previous seasons' leaves.

== Taxonomy ==
Aquilegia champagnatii is part of the Aquilegia olympica aggregate, together with Aquilegia olympica itself, Aquilegia dinarica, and Aquilegia ottonis.

=== Etymology ===
The specific epithet champagnatii honours the French Catholic priest Marcellin Champagnat, founder of the Marist Brothers of whom Benito Moraldo (1938–2023), who described the species, was a member. It was chosen as the first specimen of the plant was found on the 25th anniversary of Champagnat's beatification.

== Distribution and habitat ==
The species is endemic to the Monti Picentini and Monte Faito in Campania in southern Italy, where it was first identified on the mountain Terminio. It grows on shaded and often damp calcareous montane rocks and screes at around 1,450 m (4,760 ft) altitude.

== Ecology ==
Aquilegia champagnatii flowers in late July, and grows in a plant community also including Gentiana lutea, Achillea barrelieri subsp. mucronulata, and Hypochaeris robertia.

== Conservation ==
The species is very rare and nationally protected in Italy. It has not been assessed for the IUCN Red List.
