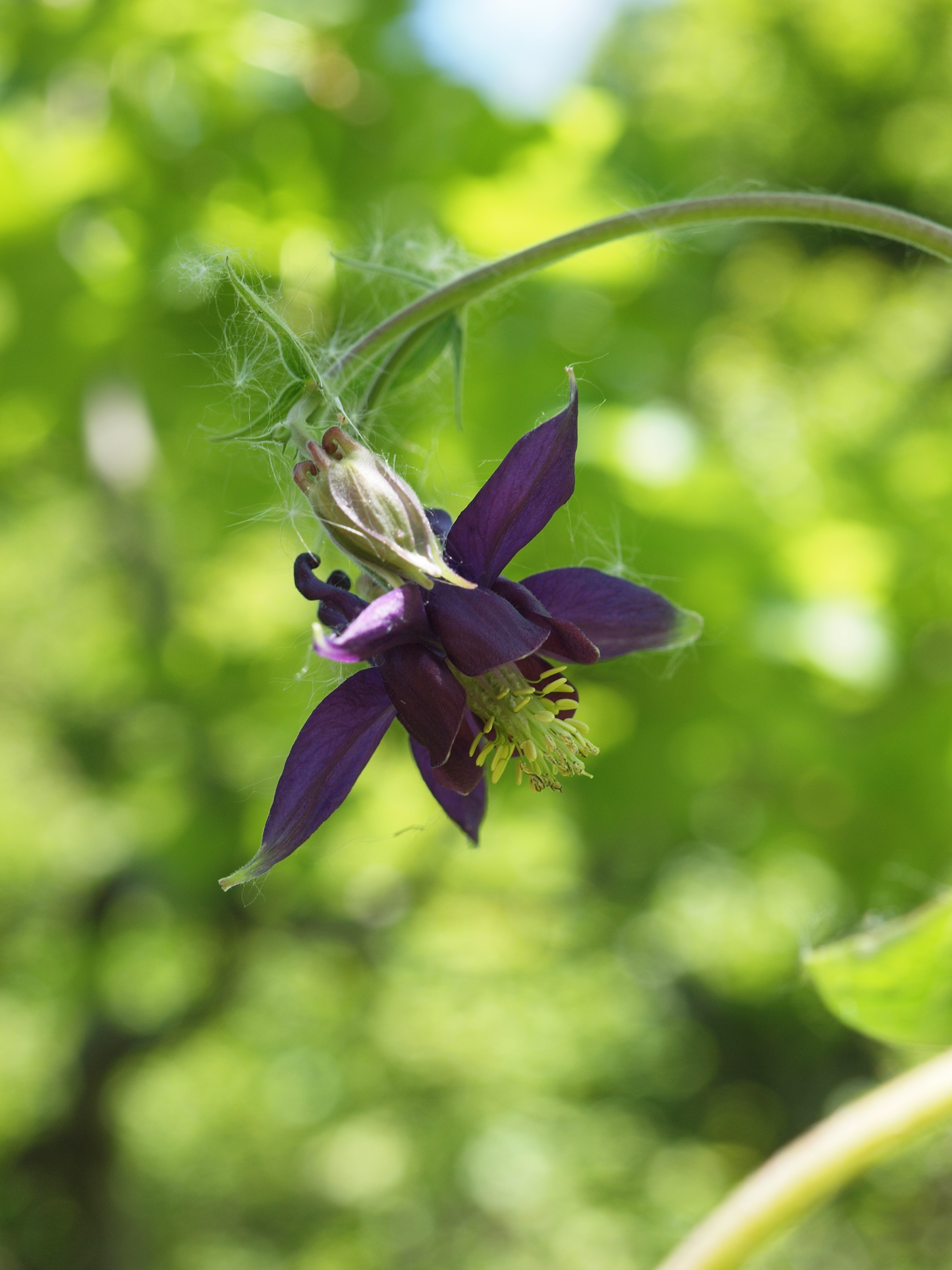
- Flower

Scientific classification
- Kingdom: Plantae
- Clade: Tracheophytes
- Clade: Angiosperms
- Clade: Eudicots
- Order: Ranunculales
- Family: Ranunculaceae
- Genus: Aquilegia
- Species: A. grata

Binomial name
- Aquilegia grata Maly ex Zimmeter

Synonyms
- List: Aquilegia nikolicii var. pancicii Niketic; Aquilegia ottonis var. grata (Maly ex Zimmeter) Rapaics; Aquilegia vulgaris subsp. grata (Maly ex Zimmeter) Brühl

= Aquilegia grata =

Balkan species of columbine

Aquilegia grata is a perennial species of flowering plant in the family Ranunculaceae, endemic to the northwestern Balkans.

== Description ==
Aquilegia grata grows to 80 cm (31 in) tall, with branched, thinly hairy stems. The leaves are 6–7 mm (0.24–0.28 in) long and pinnate, and the basal leaflets are greyish-green and trifoliate. The flowers are mauve-purple and nodding or erect, with projecting stamens and a nectar spur measuring 16–18 mm (0.63–0.71 in).

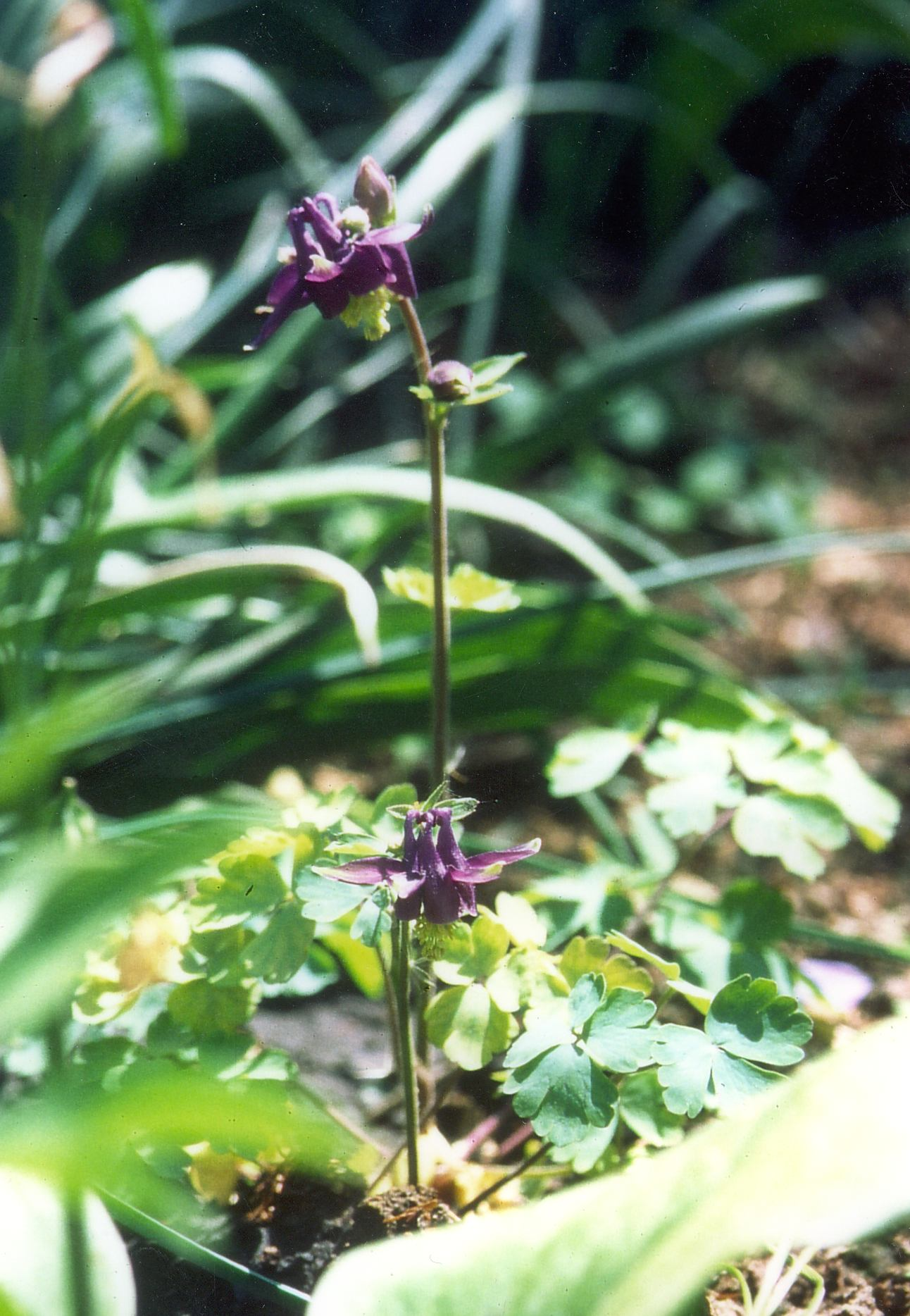
Whole plant

== Taxonomy ==
Aquilegia grata belongs to a clade containing most of the European columbine species, which appear to have diverged from their closest relatives in Asia in the early Pleistocene, a little over 2 million years ago. It is believed to be closely related to Aquilegia ottonis, Aquilegia nikolicii, and especially Aquilegia nigricans. The species was first described by the Austrian botanist Albert Zimmeter (1848–1897) in 1875 from specimens collected by Joseph Karl Maly (1797–1866) from the Orjen mountain range in Montenegro in 1864, and populations were later found in other locations by Maly and others in the Dinaric Alps, although it has been questioned whether the specimens from locations other than Orjen are in fact A. nikolicii.

=== Etymology ===
The specific epithet grata means "pleasing" or "agreeable" in Latin.

== Distribution and habitat ==
Aquilegia grata is endemic to the southeastern Dinaric Alps of Croatia, Bosnia and Herzegovina, Montenegro, Serbia, and Kosovo.

== Conservation ==
The species has not been assessed for the IUCN Red List.
