= Matheolus =

Matheolus may refer to:

- Mathieu of Boulogne, French poet
- Matheolus Perusinus, a.k.a. Matheolus of Perugia
