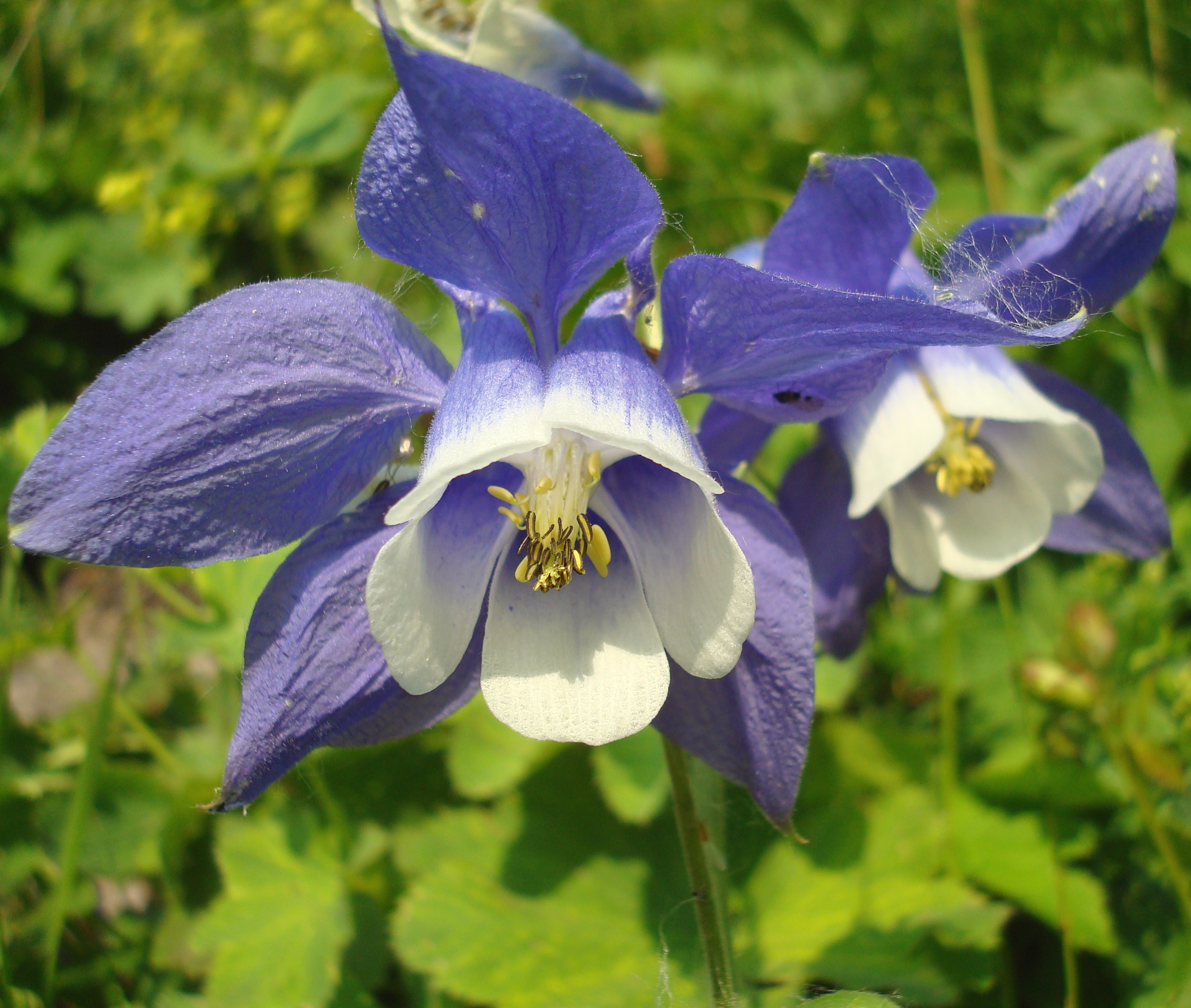
- Flower of Aquilegia olympica in the Caucasus

Scientific classification
- Kingdom: Plantae
- Clade: Tracheophytes
- Clade: Angiosperms
- Clade: Eudicots
- Order: Ranunculales
- Family: Ranunculaceae
- Genus: Aquilegia
- Species: A. olympica

Binomial name
- Aquilegia olympica Boiss.

Synonyms
- Aquilegia vulgaris var. olympica (Boiss.) Baker; Aquilegia blanda Lem.

= Aquilegia olympica =

Species of flowering plant

Aquilegia olympica is a perennial flowering plant in the family Ranunculaceae, native to Turkey, Iran, and the Caucasus.

== Description ==
Aquilegia olympica grows to 30–60 cm (12–24 in) tall. The basal leaves are biternate in form, smooth above and covered with fine or woolly hairs underneath. The leaflets have rounded teeth along their edges. The flowers have blue-violet sepals measuring 18–35 mm (0.71–1.38 in), and white petals ending in a short, somewhat hooked nectar spur.

== Taxonomy ==
The species is part of, and gives its name to, the Aquilegia olympica aggregate, together with Aquilegia champagnatii, Aquilegia dinarica, and Aquilegia ottonis. This aggregate is characterised by leafy and glandular stems, often branched inflorescences, medium or large nodding and often bicoloured flowers with hooked spurs.

== Distribution and habitat ==
Aquilegia olympica is native to northern Turkey, northern Iran, Armenia, Azerbaijan, Georgia, and the North Caucasus. Unlike the other species in the Aquilegia olympica aggregate, which prefer rocky habitats, this species grows in damp meadows and spruce forests.

== Ecology ==
Aquilegia olympica flowers in late spring and early summer. The larvae of the columbine sawfly Pristiphora rufipes have been recorded feeding on the plant.

== Conservation ==
As of November 2024, the species has not been assessed for the IUCN Red List.

== Uses ==
A decoction of Aquilegia olympica was traditionally used in eastern Turkey as a diuretic.

== Cultural significance ==
The early French printer Philippe Pigouchet used the flowers of Aquilegia olympica as a common motif in border illustrations in his Book of Hours of 1500.
