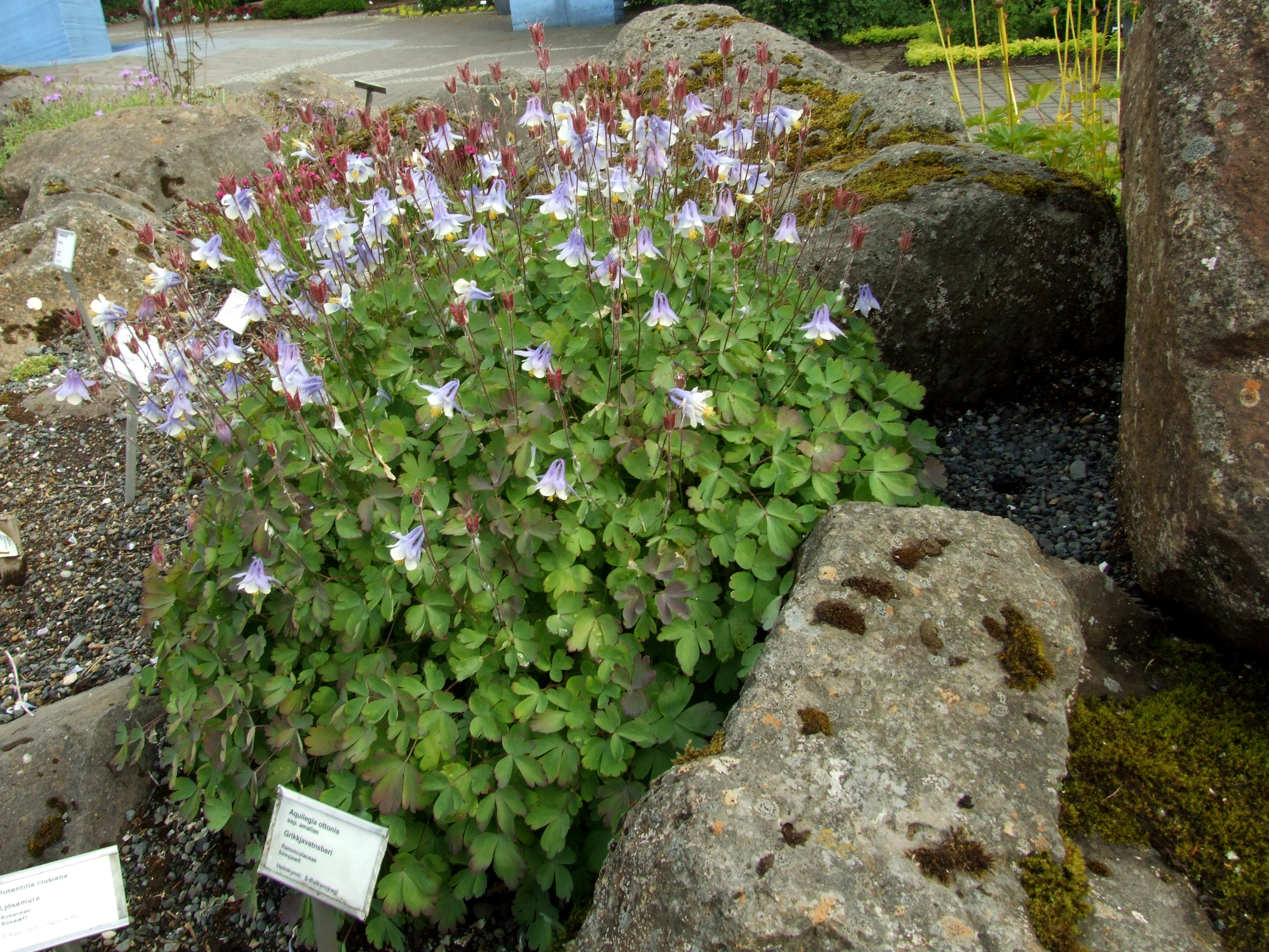
- Aquilegia ottonis growing in Reykjavík Botanic Garden

Scientific classification
- Kingdom: Plantae
- Clade: Tracheophytes
- Clade: Angiosperms
- Clade: Eudicots
- Order: Ranunculales
- Family: Ranunculaceae
- Genus: Aquilegia
- Species: A. ottonis

Binomial name
- Aquilegia ottonis Orph. ex Boiss.

Synonyms
- Aquilegia pyrenaica var. ottonis (Orph. ex Boiss.) Fiori; Aquilegia vulgaris subsp. ottonis (Orph. ex Boiss.) Brühl; Aquilegia vulgaris var. ottonis (Orph. ex Boiss.) Guadagno; Aquilegia vulgaris f. ottonis (Orph. ex Boiss.) Fiori; Aquilegia vulgaris var. typica Brühl

= Aquilegia ottonis =

Species of flowering plant native to Greece

Aquilegia ottonis is a perennial flowering plant in the family Ranunculaceae, endemic to Greece.

== Description ==
Aquilegia ottonis grows to 15–20 cm (5.9–7.9 in) in height, with branching stems and white, cream, pale bluish, or blue-purple flowers, the petals having incurved and slightly hooked nectar spurs which are light violet-blue in colour.

== Taxonomy ==
Aquilegia ottonis is part of the Aquilegia olympica aggregate, together with Aquilegia olympica itself, Aquilegia dinarica, and Aquilegia champagnatii.

The taxonomy of the species differs between authorities. It was considered by Arne Strid to comprise three subspecies:

- A. ottonis subsp. amaliae (Heldr. ex Boiss.) Strid, now treated in Plants of the World Online as a separate species, Aquilegia amaliae.
- A. ottonis subsp. ottonis Boiss., now often considered a synonym of Aquilegia ottonis rather than a subspecies thereof. Other authorities consider the status of this name unresolved.
- A. ottonis subsp. taygetea (Orph.) Strid, now treated in Plants of the World Online as a separate species, Aquilegia taygetea.

In 2009, Aquilegia vulgaris var. speluncarum Lacaita was reclassified as A. ottonis subsp. speluncarum (Lacaita) Del Guacchio. Both these names are now considered to be synonyms of Aquilegia champagnatii.

=== Etymology ===
Aquilegia ottonis is named after King Otto of Greece, the specific epithet 'ottonis' being the third declension in Latin of 'Otto'.

== Distribution and habitat ==
Aquilegia ottonis is endemic to Greece, in the vicinity of Mount Aroania in the northern Peloponnese and Mounts Giona and Parnassus on the other side of the Gulf of Corinth in central Greece. It grows in ravines at altitudes of 1,300–1,800 m (4,300–5,900 ft), preferring north-facing slopes.

Records of the species in the Alburni mountains in Italy are now classified as Aquilegia champagnatii, and those in Albania as Aquilegia amaliae.

== Ecology ==
Aquilegia ottonis flowers from mid-May to the end of July. Based on pollination syndromes, it is thought to be pollinated by bumblebees.

== Conservation ==
The species has not been assessed for the IUCN Red List. Under IUCN criteria, the species is considered vulnerable to extinction in Greece.
