= Hartmann Schedel =

German historian, cartographer, physician and humanist (1440–1514)

- Born: 13 February 1440; Free Imperial City of Nuremberg, Holy Roman Empire
- Died: 28 November 1514 (aged 74); Free Imperial City of Nuremberg, Holy Roman Empire
- Occupations: Physician, humanist, historian, cartographer

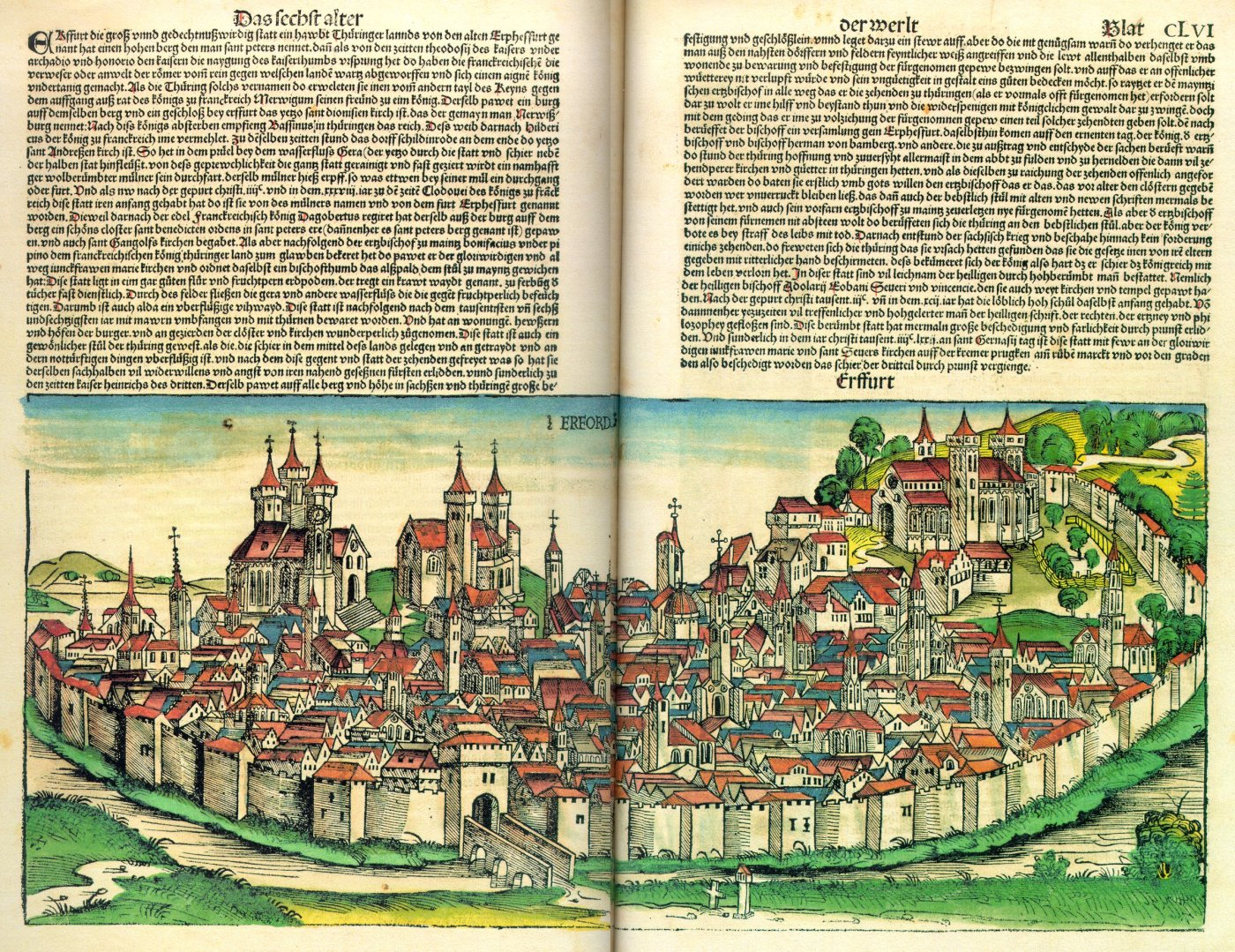
Opening from the Nuremberg Chronicle, showing Erfurt

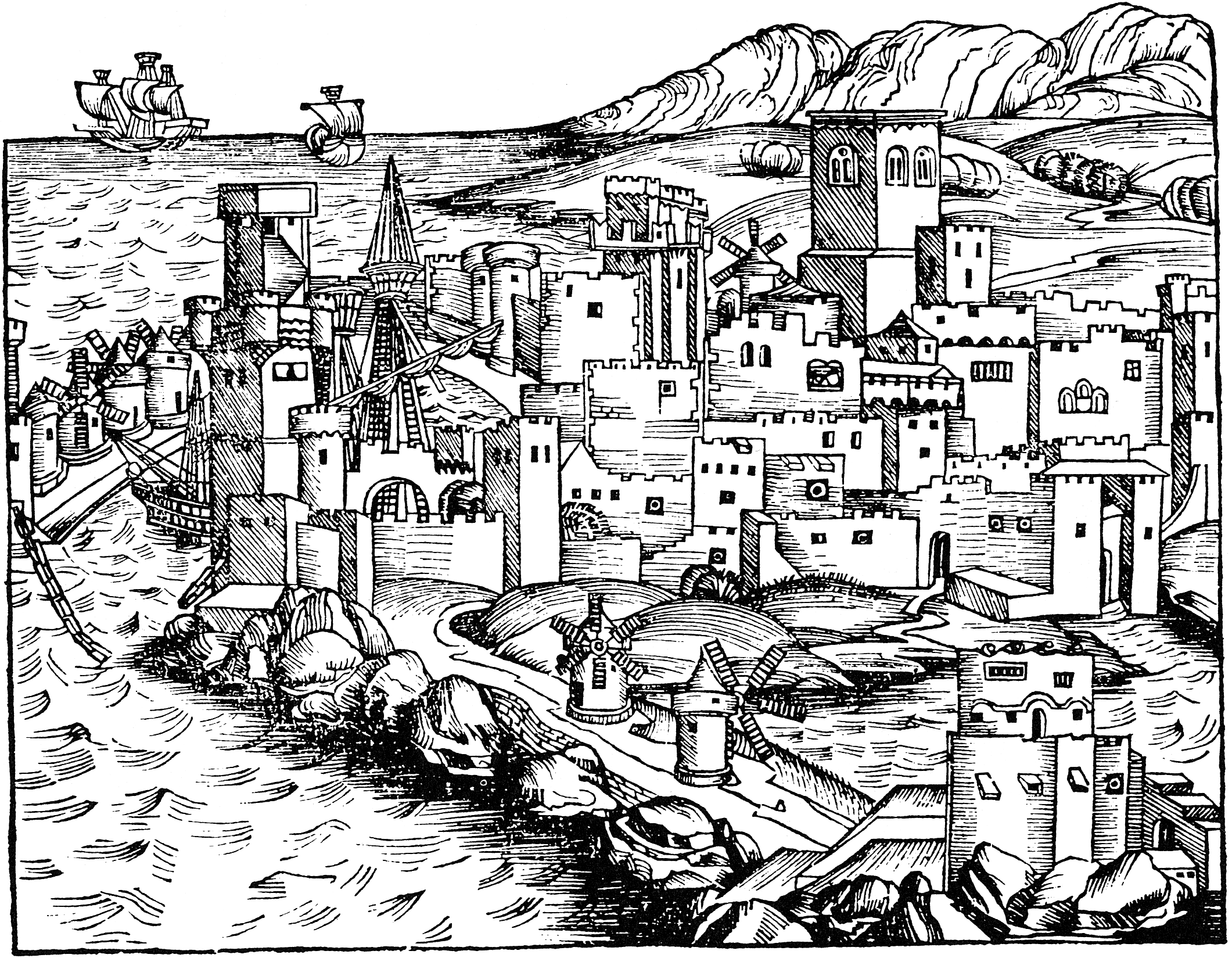
1493 Woodcut of the City of Rhodes, by Hartmann Schedel

Hartmann Schedel (13 February 1440 – 28 November 1514) was a German historian, physician, humanist, and one of the first cartographers to use the printing press. He was born and died in Nuremberg. Matheolus Perusinus served as his tutor.

Schedel is best known for his writing the text for the Nuremberg Chronicle, known as Schedelsche Weltchronik (English: Schedel's World Chronicle), published in 1493 in Nuremberg. It was commissioned by Sebald Schreyer (1446–1520) and Sebastian Kammermeister (1446–1503). Maps in the Chronicle were the first ever illustrations of many cities and countries.

With the invention of the printing press by Johannes Gutenberg in 1447, it became feasible to print books and maps for a larger customer basis. Because they had to be handwritten, books had previously been rare and very expensive.

Schedel was also a notable collector of books, art and old master prints. An album he had bound in 1504, which once contained five engravings by Jacopo de' Barbari, provides important evidence for dating de' Barbari's work.

== Gallery ==
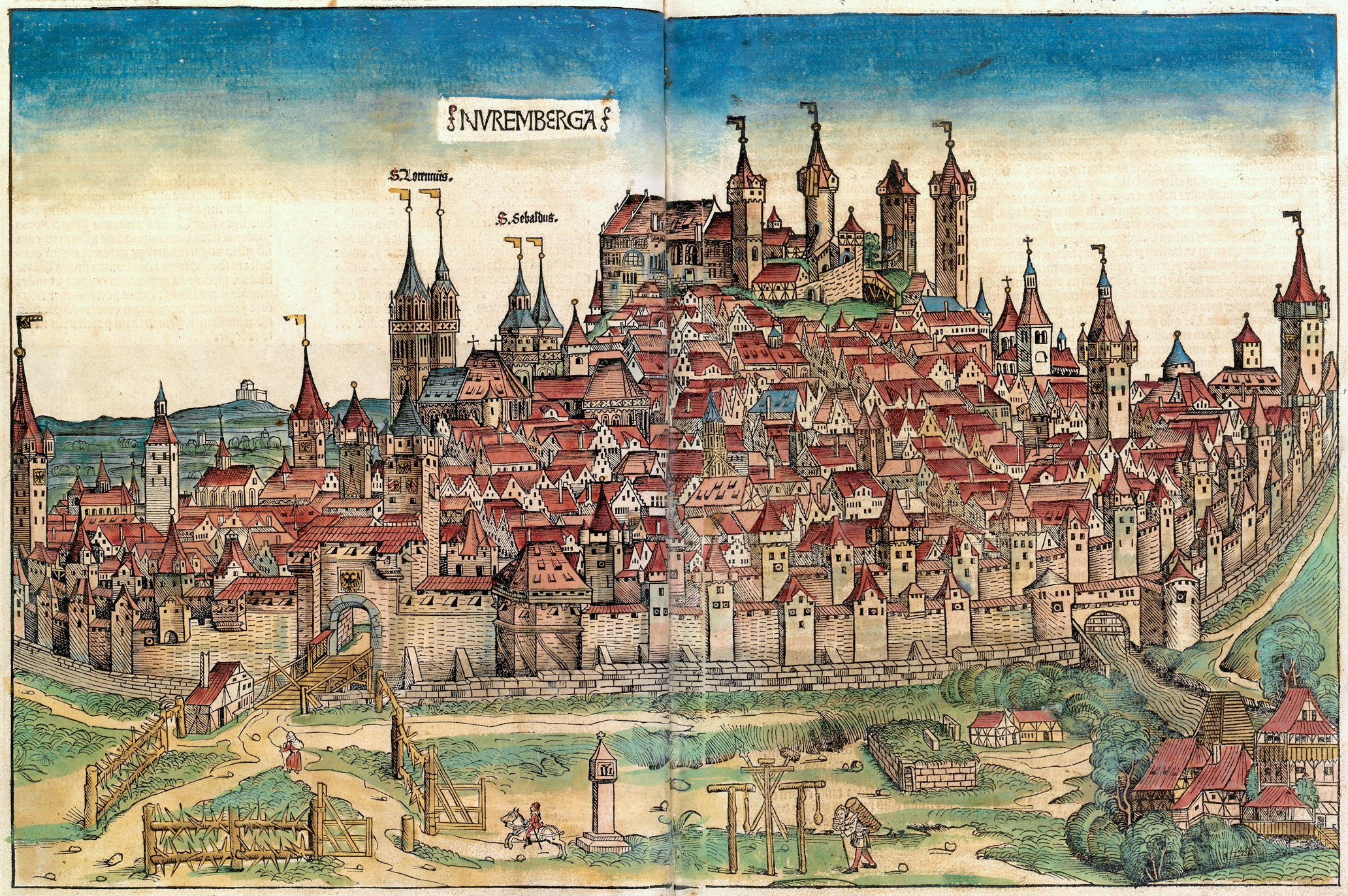
Nuremberg

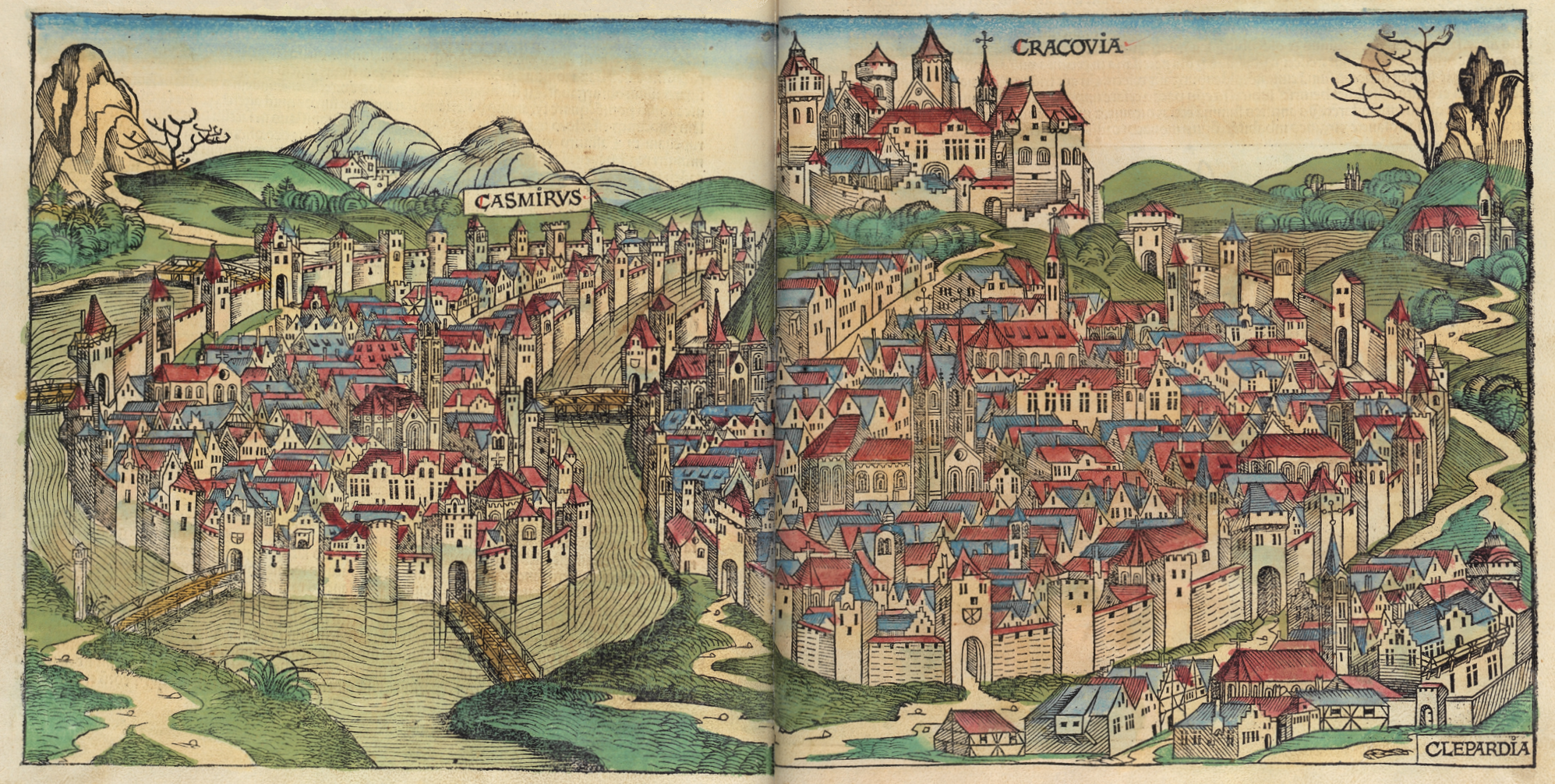
Kraków

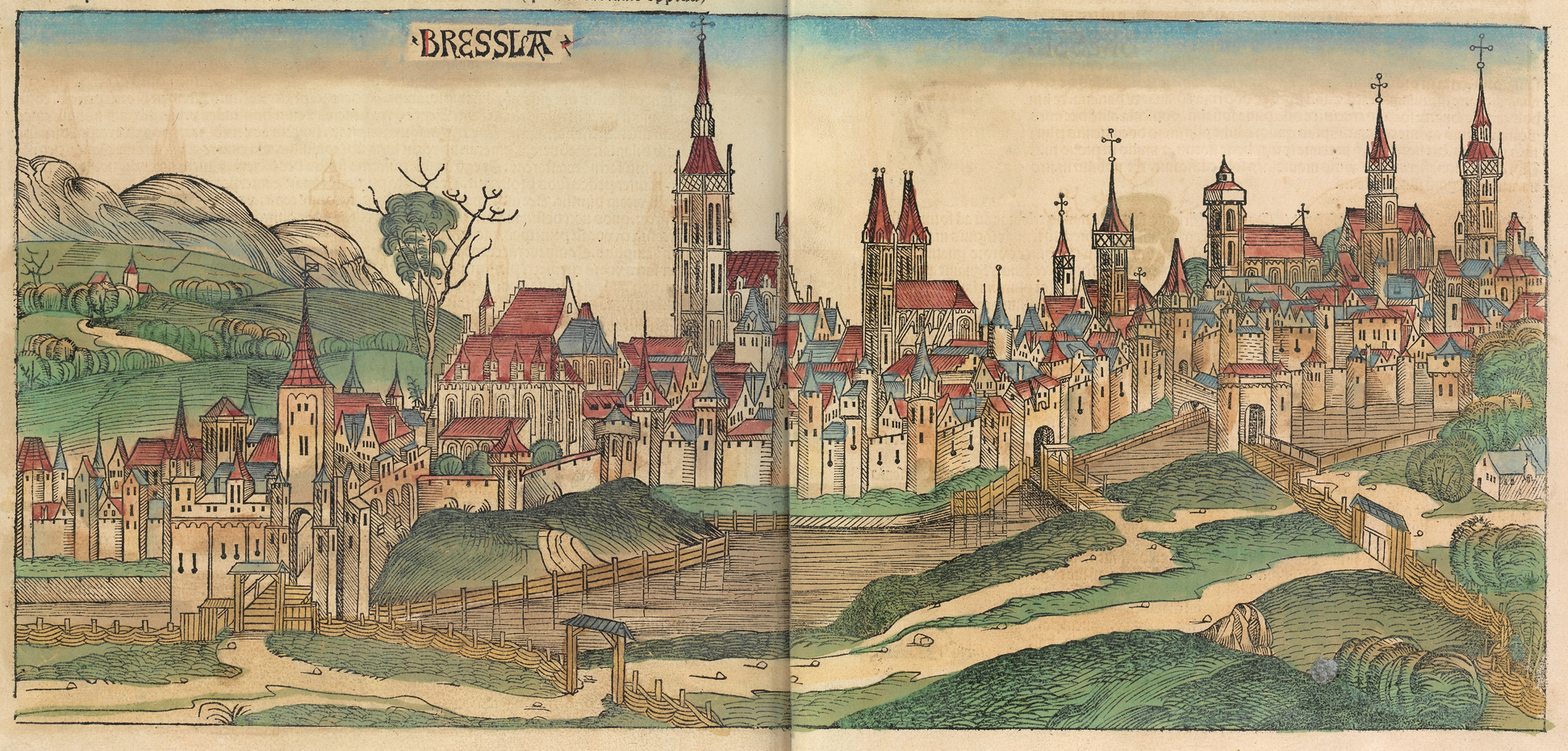
Breslau (Wrocław)

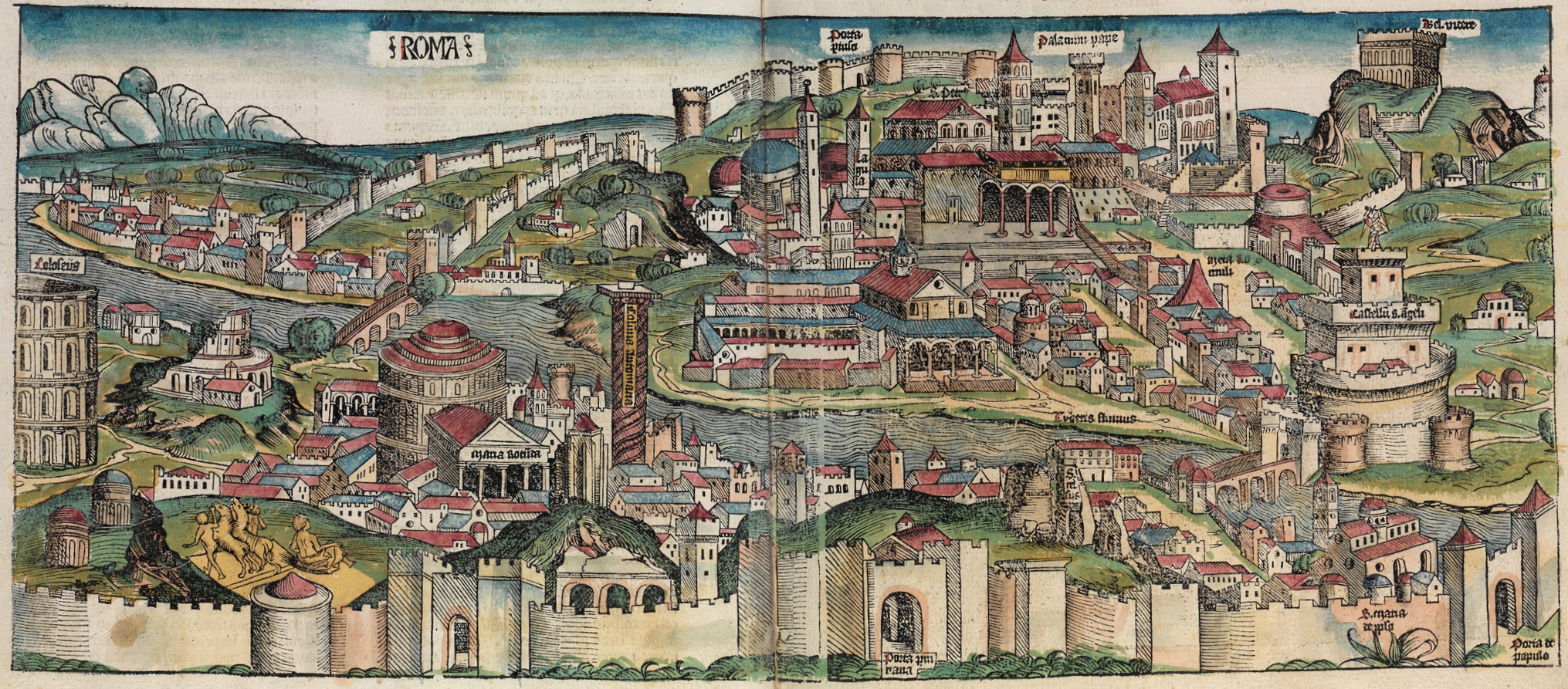
Rome

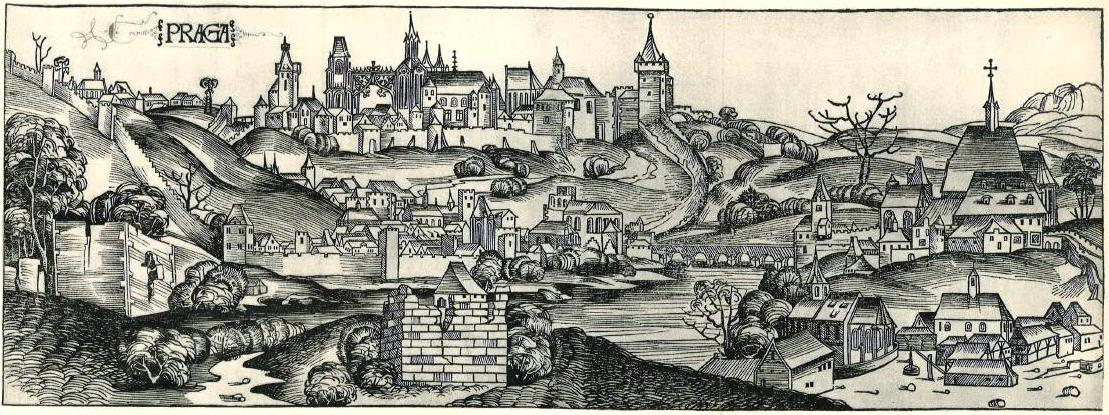
Prague

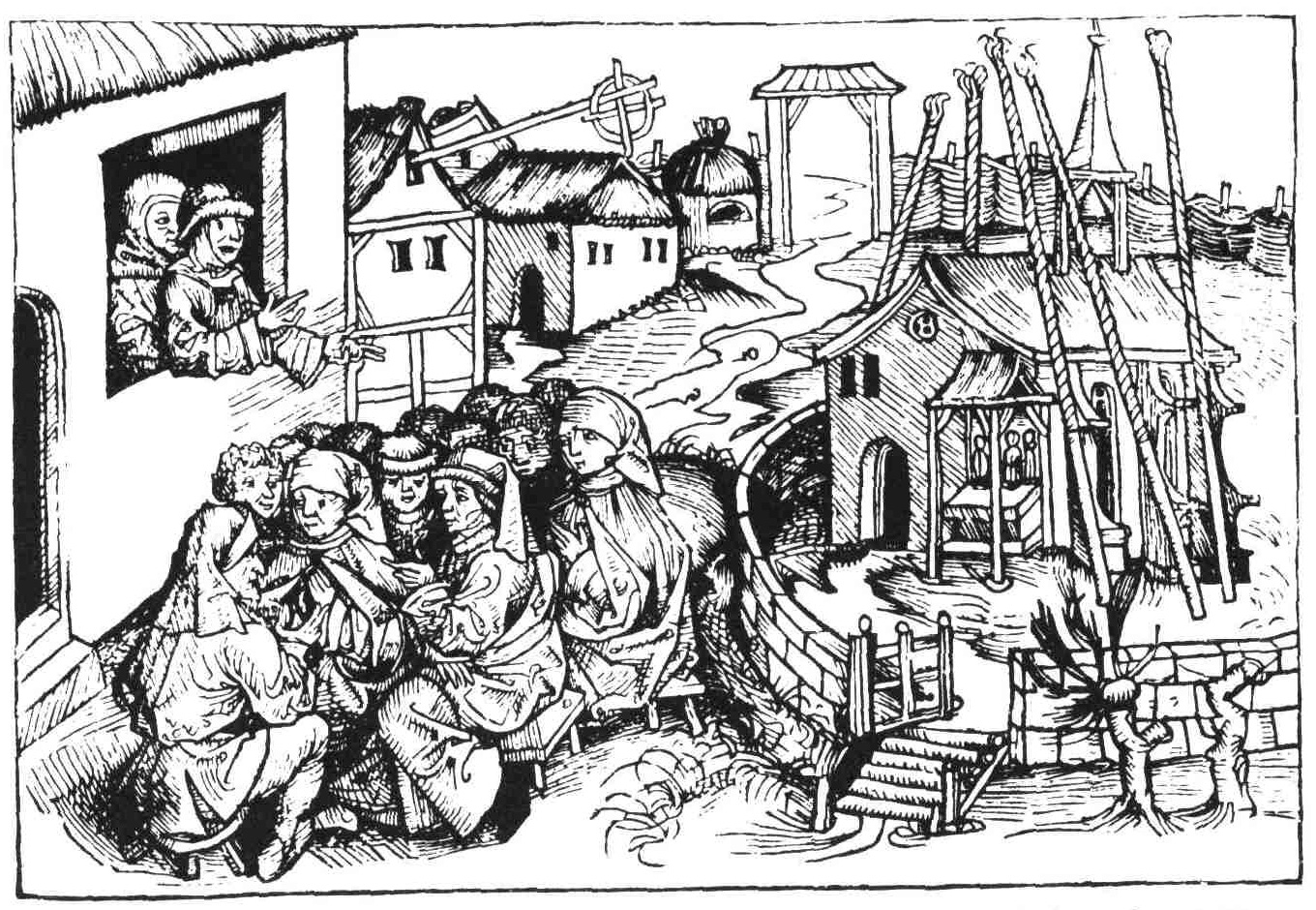
Hans Böhm, the "Pauker von Niklashausen"

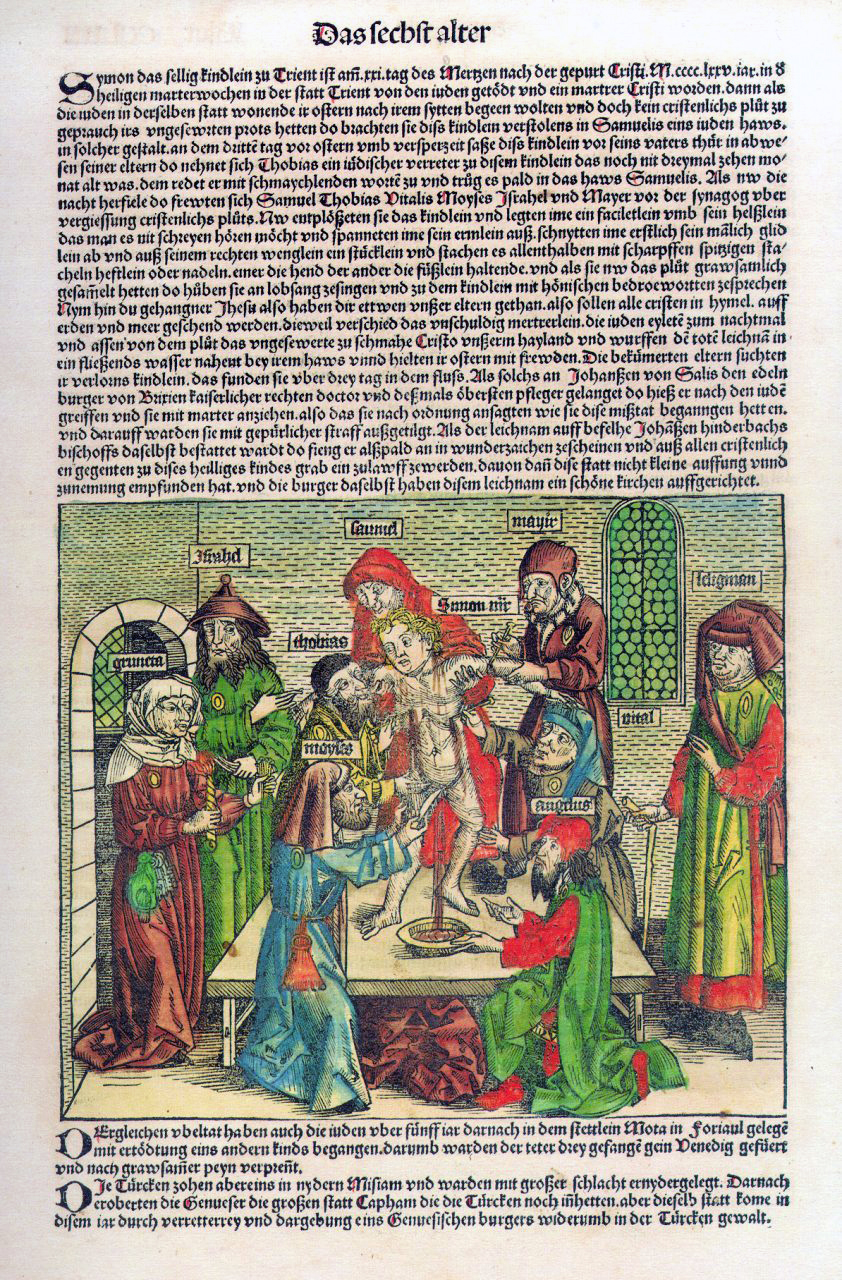
Blood libel: the supposed killing of a Christian boy at the hands of Jews in Trient in 1475. Simon of Trent

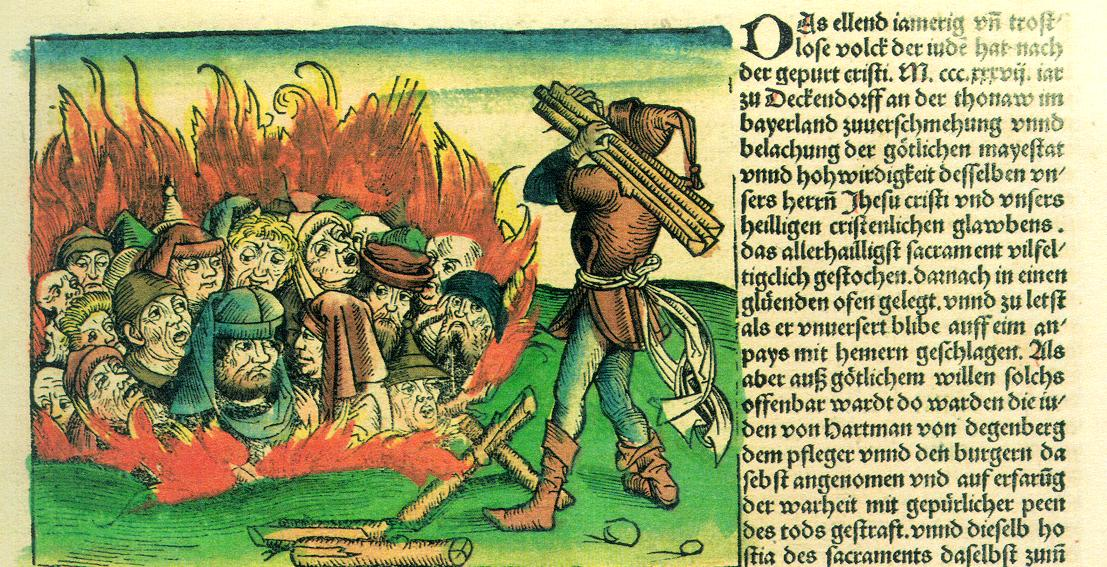
Burning of Jews for the supposed desecration of sacramental wafers in Deggendorf, Bavaria in 1492

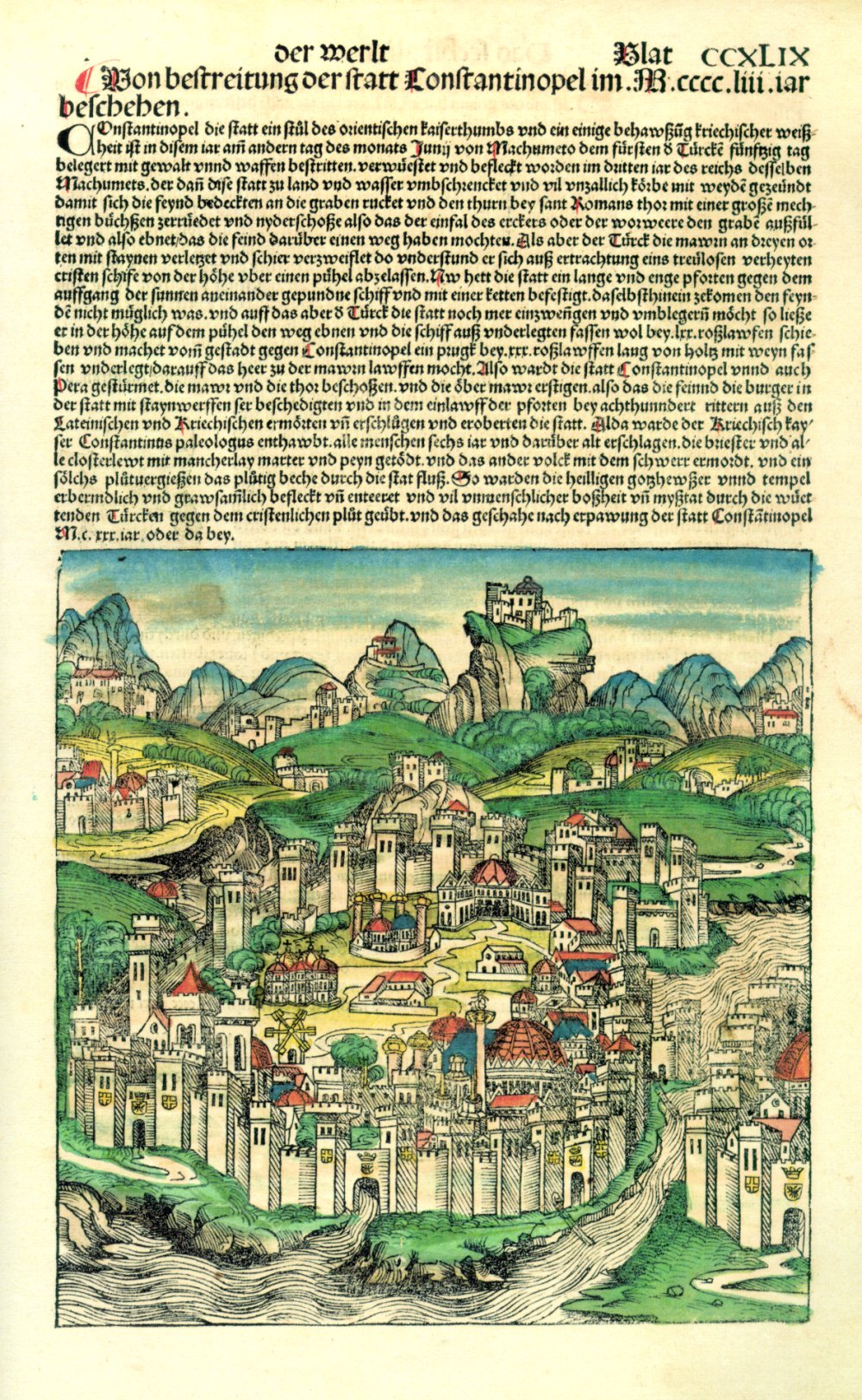
Constantinople in 1493

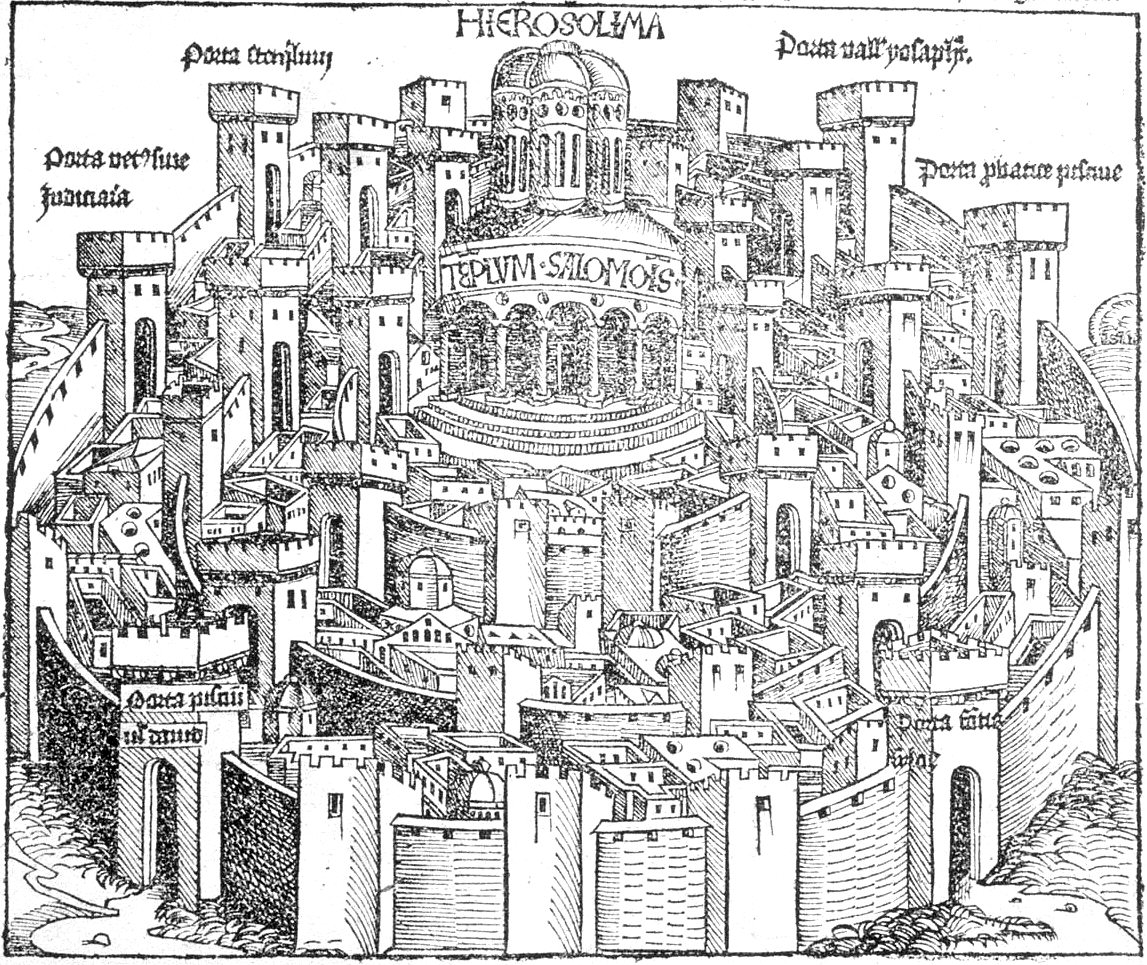
Jerusalem

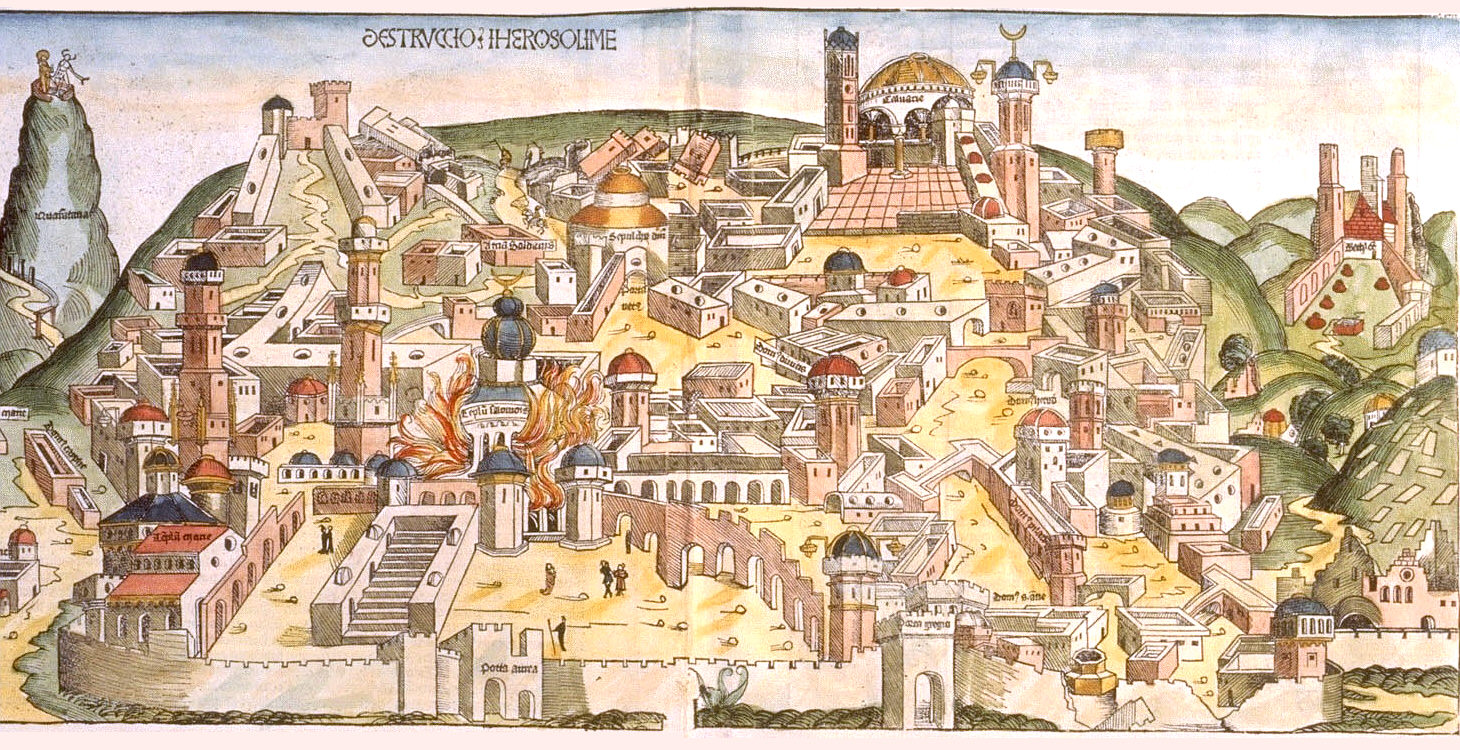
The destruction of Jerusalem by the Chaldeans

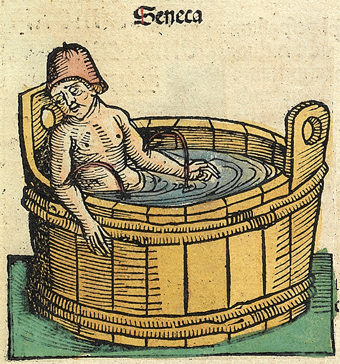
Death of Seneca

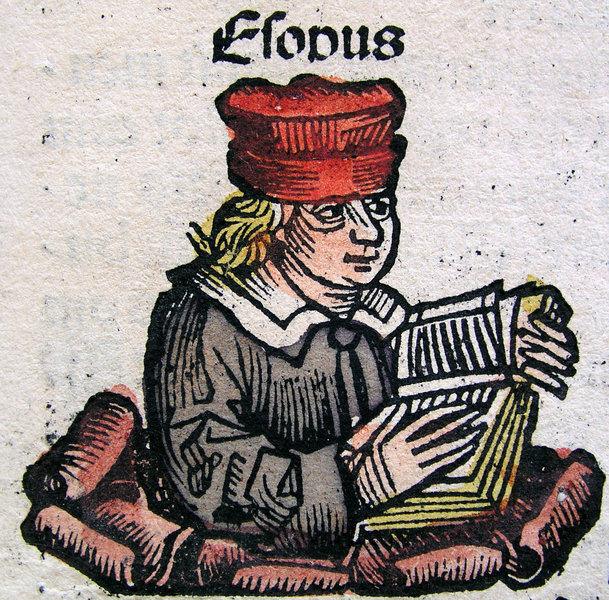
Aesop

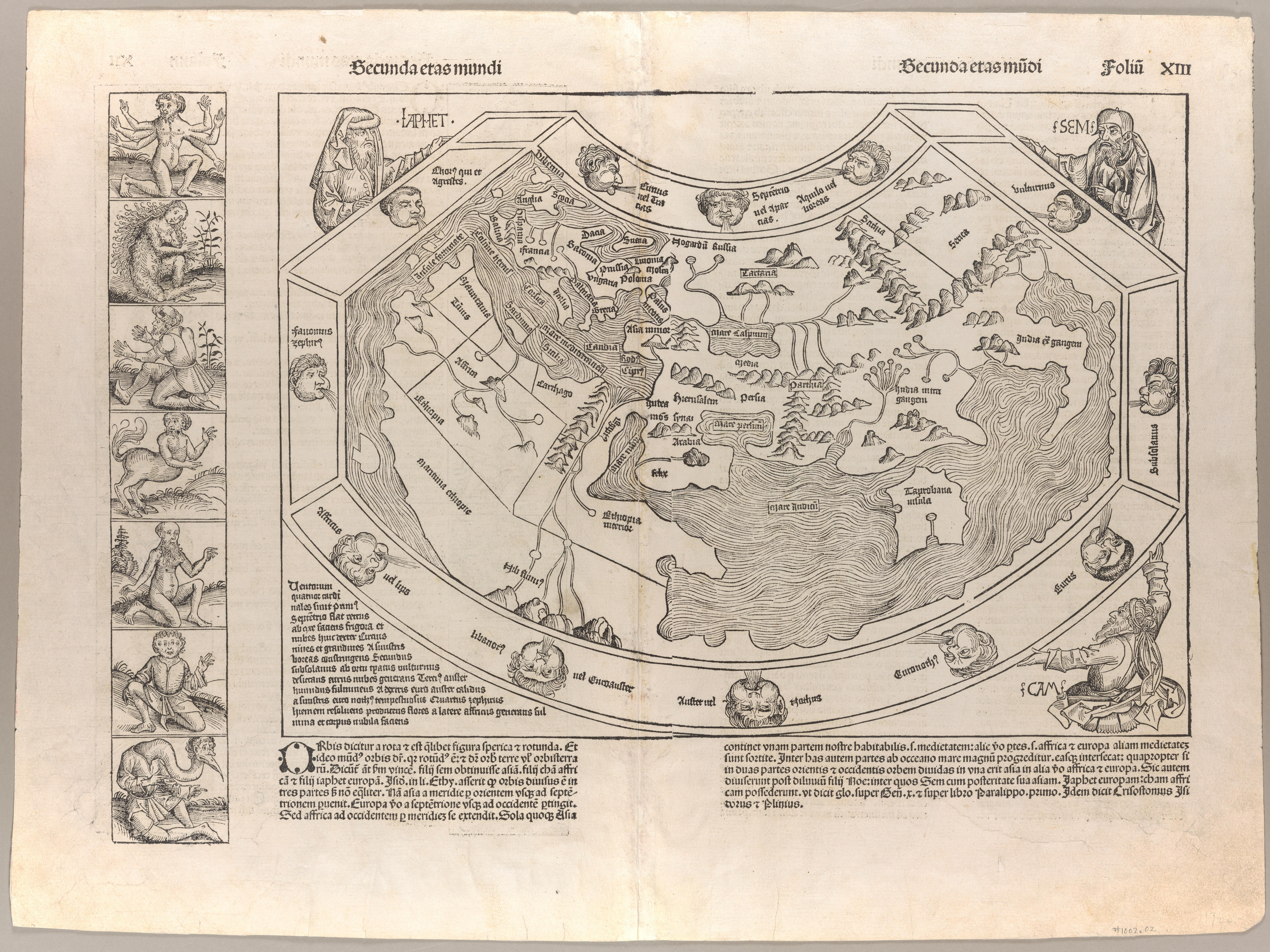
Uncolored Nuremberg Chronicle World Map (1493).

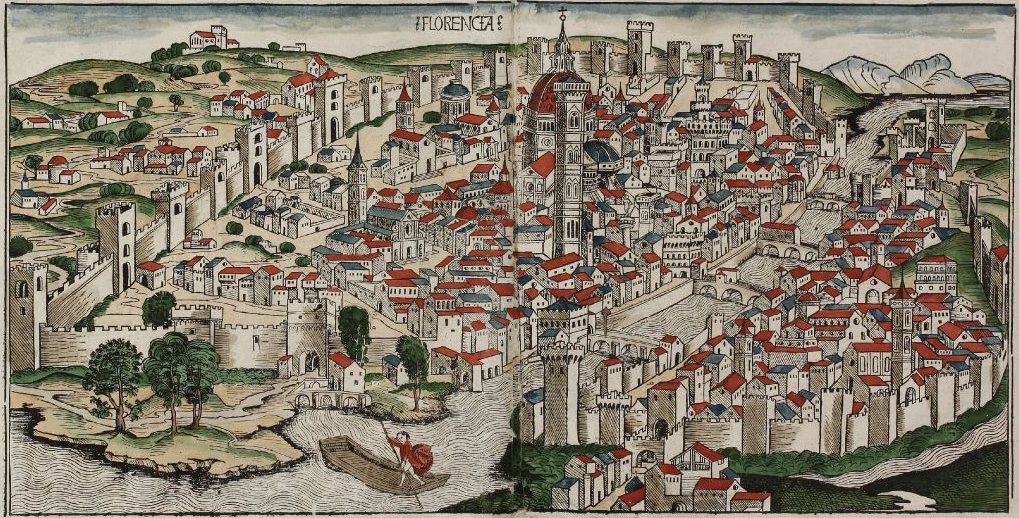
View of Florence by Hartmann Schedel, Printed in Nuremberg by Anton Koberger in 1493.

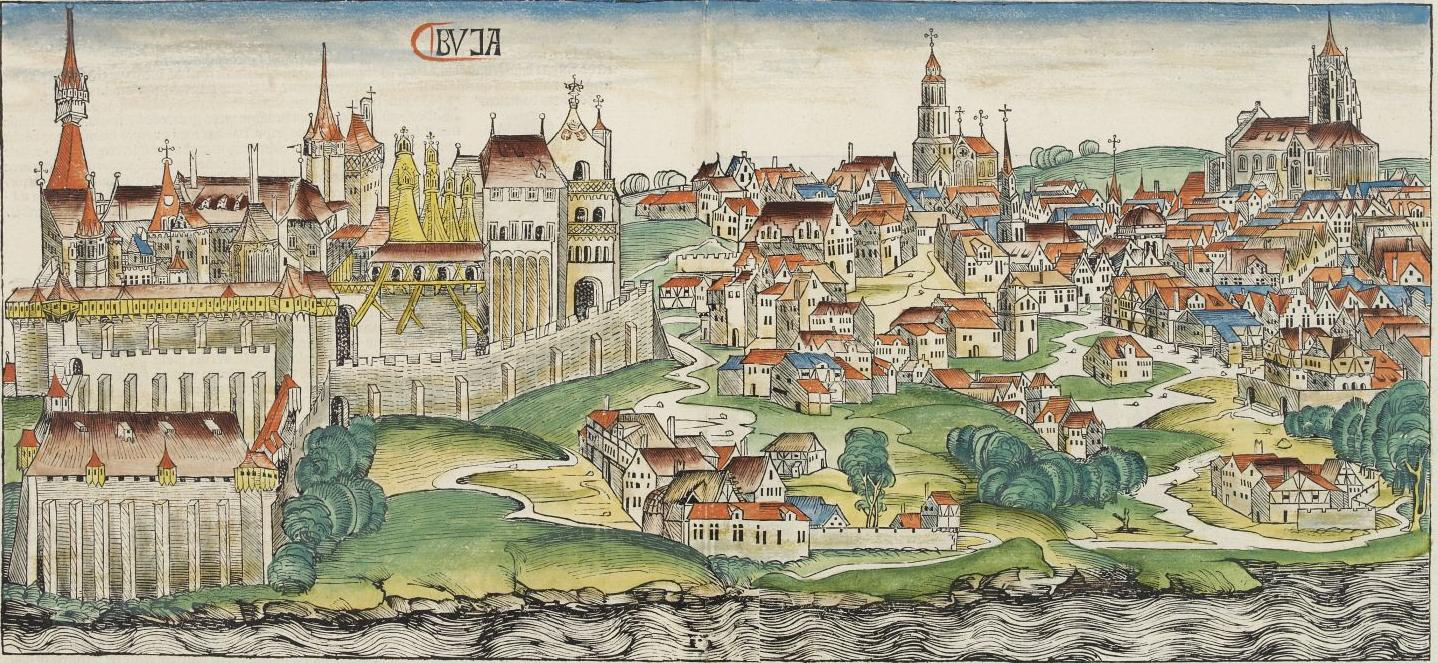
Buda in 1493

== Editions ==
- Hartmann Schedel: Registrum huius operis libri cronicarum cu [cum] figuris et imagibus [imaginibus] ab inicio mudi [mundi]. [Nachdruck der Ausgabe Nürnberg, Koberger, 1493]. Ostfildern: Quantum Books, [2002?]. - CCXCIX, [51] S., ISBN 3-935293-04-6
- Hartmann Schedel: Register des Buchs der Croniken und geschichten mit figuren und pildnussen von anbeginn der welt bis auf dise unnsere Zeit. [Durch Georgium Alten ... in diss Teutsch gebracht]. Reprint [der Ausg.] Nürnberg, Koberger, 1493, 1. Wiederdruck. München: Reprint-Verlag Kölbl, 1991. - [9], CCLXXXVI Bl., IDN: 947020551
- Hartmann Schedel: Weltchronik. Nachdruck [der] kolorierten Gesamtausgabe von 1493. Einleitung und Kommentar von Stephan Füssel. Augsburg: Weltbild, 2004. - 680 S., ISBN 3-8289-0803-9
- Stephan Füssel (Hg.): Schedel'sche Weltchronik. Taschen Verlag, Köln 2001. ISBN 3-8228-5725-4
- Digitalisat der lateinischen Ausgabe (mit brasil-portugiesischer Bedien-Oberfläche)
- Digitalisat der Bayerischen Staatsbibliothek
- Digitalisat der Beloit copy (Morse Library, Beloit College, Beloit, WI 53511, United States)
- Holzschnitte aus einem der Exemplare der Bibliothèque nationale de France

== Sources ==
- Elisabeth Rücker: Hartmann Schedels Weltchronik, das größte Buchunternehmen der Dürerzeit. Verlag Prestel, München 1988. ISBN 3-7913-0876-9
- Stephan Füssel (Hrsg.): 500 Jahre Schedelsche Weltchronik. Carl, Nürnberg 1994. ISBN 3-418-00372-9
- Peter Zahn: Hartmann Schedels Weltchronik. Bilanz der jüngeren Forschung. In: Bibliotheksforum Bayern 24 (1996), 230–248
- Christoph Reske: Die Produktion der Schedelschen Weltchronik in Nürnberg. Harrassowitz, Wiesbaden 2000. ISBN 3-447-04296-6
- Michael Zellmann-Rohrer, Constantine Hadavas, Selim S. Nahas: Liber Chronicarum Translation Volume 1. Boston. ISBN 978-0-9831407-2-6
