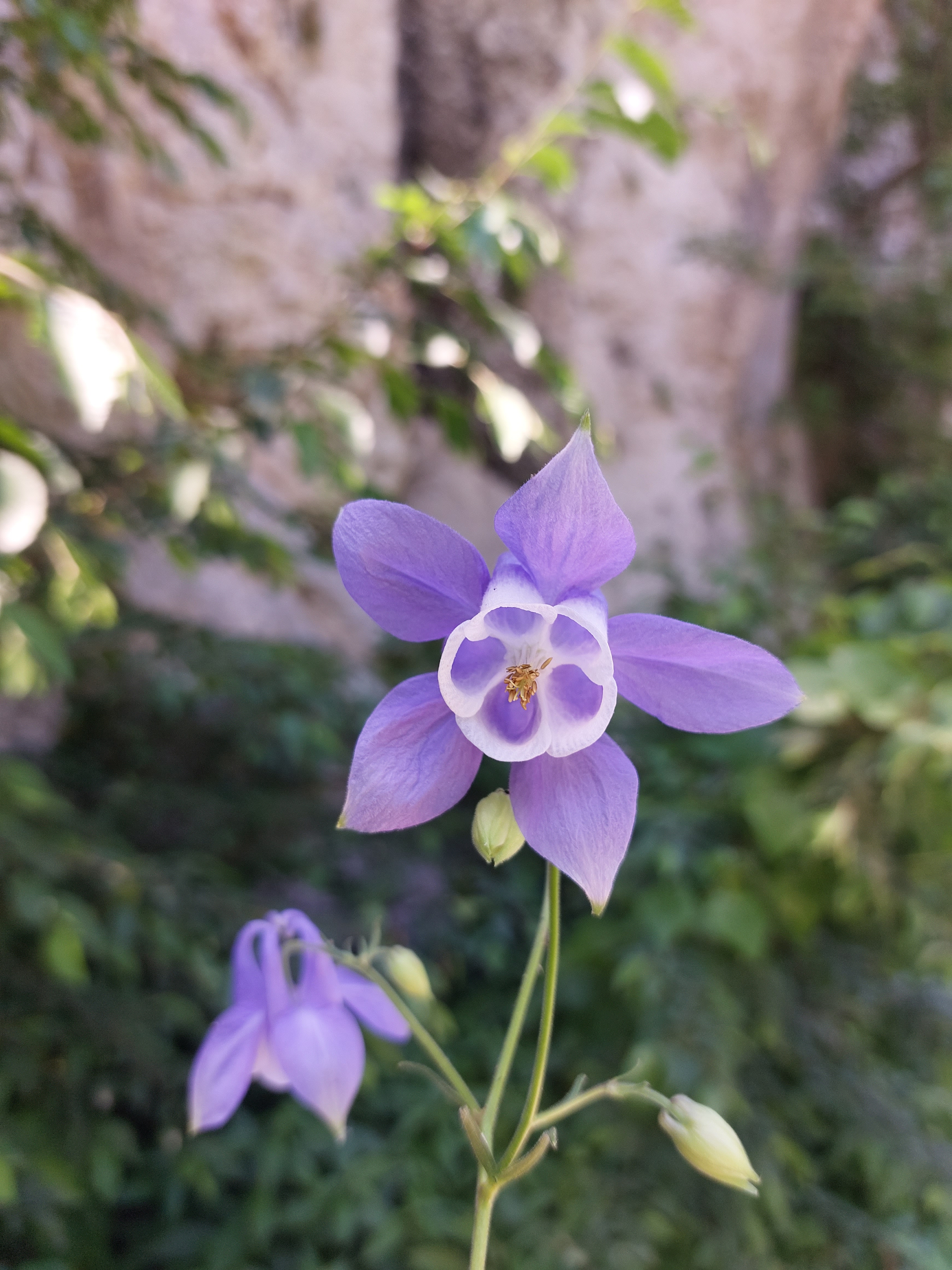
- Flower

Scientific classification
- Kingdom: Plantae
- Clade: Tracheophytes
- Clade: Angiosperms
- Clade: Eudicots
- Order: Ranunculales
- Family: Ranunculaceae
- Genus: Aquilegia
- Species: A. nikolicii

Binomial name
- Aquilegia nikolicii Niketić & Cikovac

Synonyms
- Aquilegia nikolicii f. calvescens Niketić

= Aquilegia nikolicii =

Species of flowering plant

Aquilegia nikolicii is a perennial flowering plant of the genus Aquilegia (columbines) in the family Ranunculaceae, native to the northwestern Balkans.

== Description ==
Aquilegia nikolicii is a perennial herbaceous plant growing to 50–80 cm (20–31 in) in height. The leaves at the base and on the stem are finely hairy on both sides, rarely smooth on the upper surface. The stems of the leaflets have fine hairs up to 1 mm long, while the leaflets themselves are wedge-shaped, rounder at the base, and average 35 mm (1.4 in) long. The sepals are broadly oblong to egg-shaped and bluish-purple. The petals are around 1 cm (0.4 in) long, bluish-purple with white tips, and have nectar spurs 15–19 mm (0.6–0.7 in) in length.

== Taxonomy ==
=== Taxonomic history ===
The plant was initially described as a subspecies nikolicii of Aquilegia grata by the Serbian botanist Marjan Niketić in 1992. In 2013, Niketić and Pavle Cikovac raised it to the rank of species as A. nikolicii.

The type specimen was collected by Niketić on 11 June 1991 near the Serbian town of Bajina Bašta in the Drina river valley, on north-facing gravelly limestone cliffs at an altitude of around 250 m (820 ft).

=== Subdivision ===
Two varieties and one form of the species are recognised:

- A. nikolicii var. nikolicii
- A. nikolicii var. pancicii (endemic to Mokra Gora)
- A. nikolicii f. calvescens

=== Etymology ===
The specific epithet nikolicii honours the Serbian botanist Vojislav Nikolić (1925–1989).

== Distribution and habitat ==
A. nikolicii is endemic to moist canyons in the Drina and West Morava river basins in eastern Bosnia, western Serbia, and northern Montenegro. It grows at altitudes of 250–1,200 m (820–3,937 ft) in damp, shady limestone rock crevices and screes in mixed forests including European hop-hornbeam, black pine, common beech, and Serbian spruce trees. It is a member of the chasmophytic (crevice-adapted) Centaureo derventanae-Seslerietum tenuifoliae plant community.

== Conservation ==
As of April 2026, the species has not been assessed for the IUCN Red List, but based on the treatment of A. grata, from which the taxon was split, it can reasonably be estimated as having Vulnerable (VU) status. It is classed as strictly protected under Serbian law.
