= Martin Morin =

French printer (c. 1450 – c. 1522)

Martin Morin was a French printer of incunables, active in Rouen between about 1490 and 1518. It has been suggested that he was born in or near Orbec around 1450, and died in Rouen around 1522. He learned the trade in the Rhine region where he was sent by the Rouen family Lallemant together with Pierre Maufer, and then became a printer and bookseller in Rouen. His 1492 Breviarium Saresberiense or Breviarium Sarum, a breviary for Salisbury, is said to be "the first recorded liturgical book printed for the English market".

The Incunabula Short Title Catalogue of the British Library lists 34 works. Other works are listed in the Manuel du bibliographe normand: ou, Dictionnaire bibliographique ..., Volume 2 by Édouard Frère.

== Publications ==
- 1490: Festivalis Liber
- About 1490: Breviarium Cenomanense (Le Mans). Ed: Petrus Hennier (new edition about 1500-1503)
- About 1492: Breviarium Saresberiense (Salisbury)
- 1492: Missale Saresberiense (Salisbury) sive Missale secundum Sarum (new edition about 1505)
- 1492-1493: Horae: ad usum Andegavensem (Angers) [French and Latin]
- 1493: Missale Turonense (Tours)
- About 1494: Horae: ad usum Sarum (Salisbury)
- 1494: David de Augusta. De exterioris et interioris hominis compositione Lib. II-III ( Profectuum religiosorum)
- Guido de Monte Rochen. Manipulus curatorum (also a 1495 edition)
- About 1495: Bernardus Claravallensis. De concordantia statuum religiosorum. Add: De dispensatione et praecepto
- Bonaventura, S. Diaeta salutis. Add: Devota contemplatio, seu meditatio de nativitate domini
- 1495: Johannes Chrysostomus. De reparatione lapsi
- Missale Rothomagense (Rouen) (new edition 1499)
- About 1496: Robertus Gaguinus. De mundissimo Virginis Mariae conceptu. Comm: Carolus Fernandus
- 1496: Missale Sagiense (Sées)
- About 1497: Publius Ovidius Naso. De remedio amoris
- 1497: Missale Ebroicense (Evreux)
- About 1497-1498: Bernardus Claravallensis. De consideratione. Add: Sermo de cute, carne et ossibus animae
- Nicolaus Bovillus. Contra obtinentes plura beneficia
- Coutumes de Normandie. Add: Usaiges et la forme qu'on a acoustume user en conduite de proces et iudicature de causes en la duchie de normendie
- 1498: Ebrardus Bethuniensis. Graecismus. Comm: Johannes Vincentius Metulinus
- About 1500: Confessionale. Interrogationes et doctrinae
- Franciscus de Assisio. Regula. Testamentum. Ed: Alphonsus de Salamina
- Jean Laillier. De provisione scholasticorum ex Pragmatica Sanctione
- Lucidarius [French] Le lucidaire
- Principia grammatice [French and Latin]
- Heures de Bayeux
- About 1500-1510: La vie saint jehan baptiste
- About 1503-1506: Examen de conscience
- After 1503: Nicolaus Denyse. Gemma praedicantium (also an edition from about 1507)
- 1504-1505: Alain Chartier. La belle dame sans merci
- 1505: Missale Abrincensis (Avranches)
- 1506: Nicolaus Denyse. Opus super Sententias Petri Lombardi quod Resolutio theologorum dicitur
- Missale Ambianense (Amiens)
- Noviomense (Noyon)
- 1507 or later: Nicolaus de Lyra. Tractatus de differentia nostrae translationis ab hebraica littera in Veteri Testamento
- 1507: Apologia Frederici Le Vicomte
- 1510: Aelius Donatus. Ars minor
- 1518: Heures de Rouen (two editions)
