= Aquilegia colchica =

Scientific classification
- Kingdom: Plantae
- Clade: Tracheophytes
- Clade: Angiosperms
- Clade: Eudicots
- Order: Ranunculales
- Family: Ranunculaceae
- Genus: Aquilegia
- Species: A. colchica

Binomial name
- Aquilegia colchica Kem.-Nath.

Georgian endemic columbine species

Aquilegia colchica is a perennial flowering plant in the family Ranunculaceae, endemic to the Caucasus Mountains in Georgia. The plant blooms in spring with blue and white flowers. It is considered an endangered species in Georgia.

== Description ==
Aquilegia colchica is a perennial herb growing to 30–50 cm (12–20 in) tall, with sticky stems covered by characteristic silvery, downy hairs. The basal leaves are biternate and covered with dense, light grey downy hairs, with leaflets of a rounded wedge shape. The flowers are solitary and two-coloured, blue and white, with sepals of a rounded lanceolate shape. The petals are egg-shaped and blue or light blue, with a blue, strongly twisted, and downy nectar spur.

== Taxonomy ==
The species was formally described by the Georgian botanist Liubov Kemularia-Nathadze in 1934 from specimens collected in the gorge of the river Qvirila. It can produce fertile hybrid offspring with another endemic Aquilegia species of the western Caucasus, Aquilegia gegica.

=== Etymology ===
The specific epithet colchica is taken from the classical placename Colchis, in the area to which the species is native. The genus name Aquilegia may come from the Latin word for "eagle", aquila, in reference to the pedals' resemblance to eagle talons.

== Distribution and habitat ==
Aquilegia colchica is endemic to Georgia, growing in rocky areas in the western Caucasus mountains. Known populations include those in the gorges of the river Qvirila and its tributary, the Jruchula River.

== Conservation ==
As of December 2024, the species has not been assessed for the IUCN Red List. It is nationally classed as an endangered species in Georgia.

== Ecology ==
Aquilegia colchica flowers in spring.
