= Philippe Pigouchet =

French printer and wood engraver

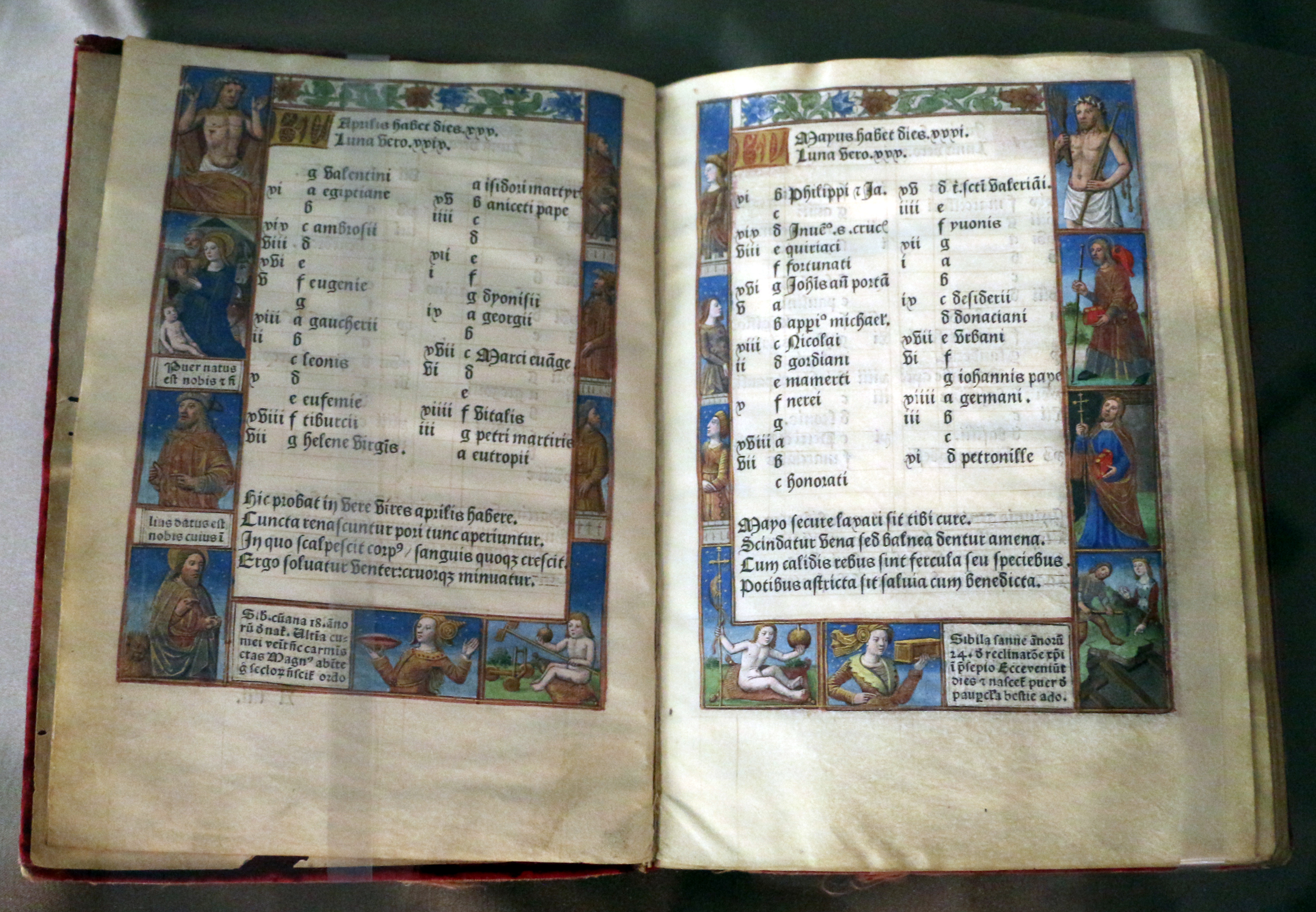
Book of Hours, 1491, Biblioteca Trivulziana, Milan

Philippe Pigouchet (active 1488–1518) was a French printer and wood engraver who worked for and closely with Simon Vostre, a book keeper and publisher who planned the idea to create the fourth Book of Hours.

== Contribution ==
Philippe Pigouchet was known for printing incunabula Book of Hours. There are over 150 known works that he printed, of which 90 were Book of Hours. The special technique of cursive used to produce classical texts in manuscripts was called Humanist Hand. This unique form of type letter is now known for as Italic or Aldine. Also considered, both a printer and engraver, Pigouchet appears to have introduced the criblé technique, in which the black areas of a woodblock are punched with white dots, giving the page a lively tonality. Beside the Horae, Pigouchet also printed the only known copy of the book of Hours for Sarum at Paris in 1494 for the Rouen bookseller Jean Richard. This is the earliest edition of the Hours printed outside the United Kingdom that survives in more than a few fragments, and is possibly the earliest French-printed edition on record. Philippe Pigouchet's collaboration with Simon Vostre lasted for over 18 years, during which period the duo produced hundreds of Books of Hours for European readers. They contributed immensely to the publishing of Books of Hours. According to Sandra Hindman, over 1,775 editions of Books of Hours were published between 1475 and 1600.

Some works by Pigouchet and Vostre survive today. There are six bound copies in the possession of Princeton University. This includes 16 large metalcuts and numerous other illustrations made by the duo. A set of leaves and ten metalcuts from a 1496 edition are in The Graphic Arts Collection .

== Horae ==
Influenced by German and Italian decorations, the book of hours was known for historical reasons with illustrations and prints based on calligraphy used by scribes of the fifteenth century. Pigouchet is known for illustrating one of the most remarkable prints for the book of hours that contained twenty-three large cuts and each of its 144 pages is surrounded by smaller borders filled with charming detailed ornaments. Philippe Pigouchet and Simon Vostre assembled the book of hours for Cambrai and Besançon. Similar work by Antoine Vérard in Paris during 1508 was produced and printed for Chartres. Antoine was well known for being a part of a creative movement of biblical books. Verard issued the first printed Book of Hours and the first to create the book a work of art. Dupre, who worked for Verard considered Pigouchet his formidable rival because of the beautifully printed works of the book of hours. Such cradle-editions like the Horae was not printed for everyone. They were printed for collector's care of the wealthy. Gutenberg and Sweynheym, Aldus and D'Alopa, Vostre and Pigouchet and Caxton and De Worde were considered to be the greatest men in printing of the fifteenth century. The Book of Hours were printed on vellum or illustrated with color by hand and illuminated in gold and silver in the fashion of the more expensive manuscript.

== Examples of Work ==
Page from HORAE. Paris circa 1503, 7x4- Made out of metal cuts or wood by Philippe Pigouchet

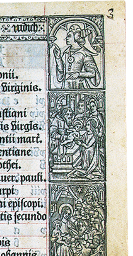
Philippe Pigouchet, page/border from Horae Beatus Virginis Mariae (Hours of the Blessed Virgin Mary), 1498

Two pages of Sarum Book of Hours, 1494 By Philippe Pigouchet
