= Matheolus Perusinus =

15th-century Italian professor of philosophy and medicine

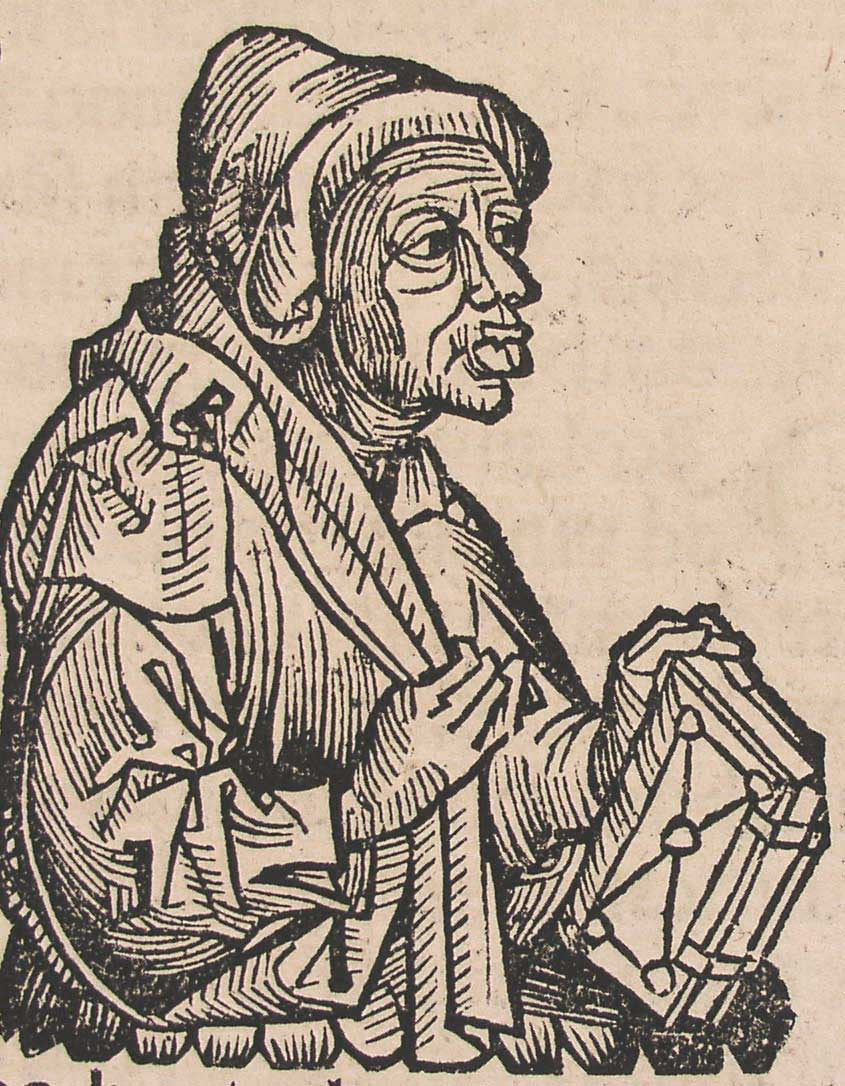
Matheolus, from the Nuremberg Chronicles (1493)

Matheolus Perusinus (Mattheolus de Perusio, Mattiolo Mattioli, Matthiolus de Matthiolis, Matthiolus de Matthiolis) (died 1480) was a professor of philosophy and medicine. He was a native of Perugia (hence his name), and died at Padua.

He was the tutor of Hartmann Schedel and the author of a work on human memory (Tractatus Artis Memorativæ).
