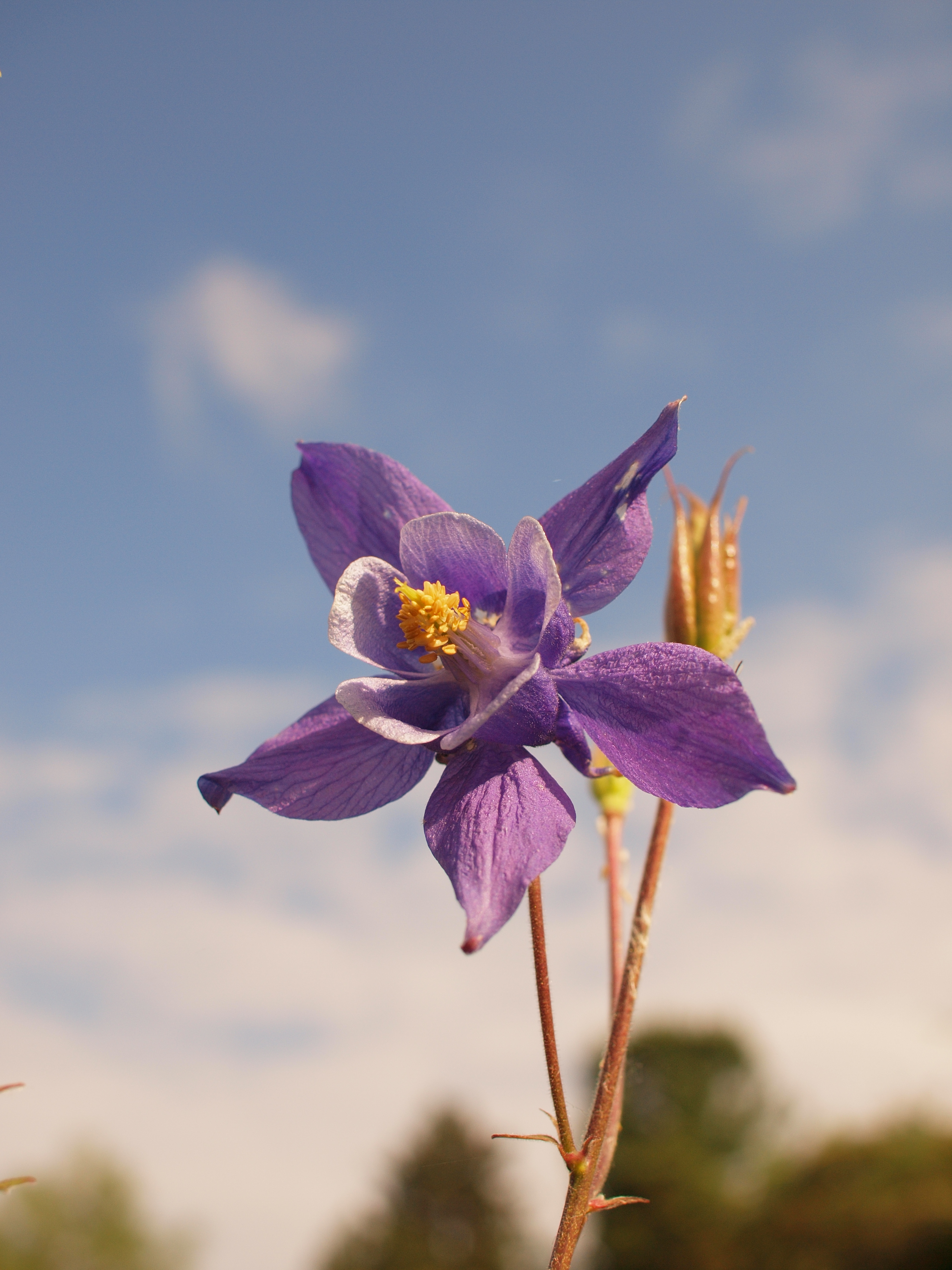
- Flower

Scientific classification
- Kingdom: Plantae
- Clade: Tracheophytes
- Clade: Angiosperms
- Clade: Eudicots
- Order: Ranunculales
- Family: Ranunculaceae
- Genus: Aquilegia
- Species: A. dinarica

Binomial name
- Aquilegia dinarica Beck

Synonyms
- List: Aquilegia amaliae var. dinarica (Beck) Hayek; Aquilegia vulgaris var. dinarica (Beck) Brühl

= Aquilegia dinarica =

Balkan species of columbine

Aquilegia dinarica, the Dinaric columbine, is a perennial species of plant in the family Ranunculaceae, endemic to the Dinaric Alps of northern Albania, Bosnia and Herzegovina, Croatia, and Montenegro.

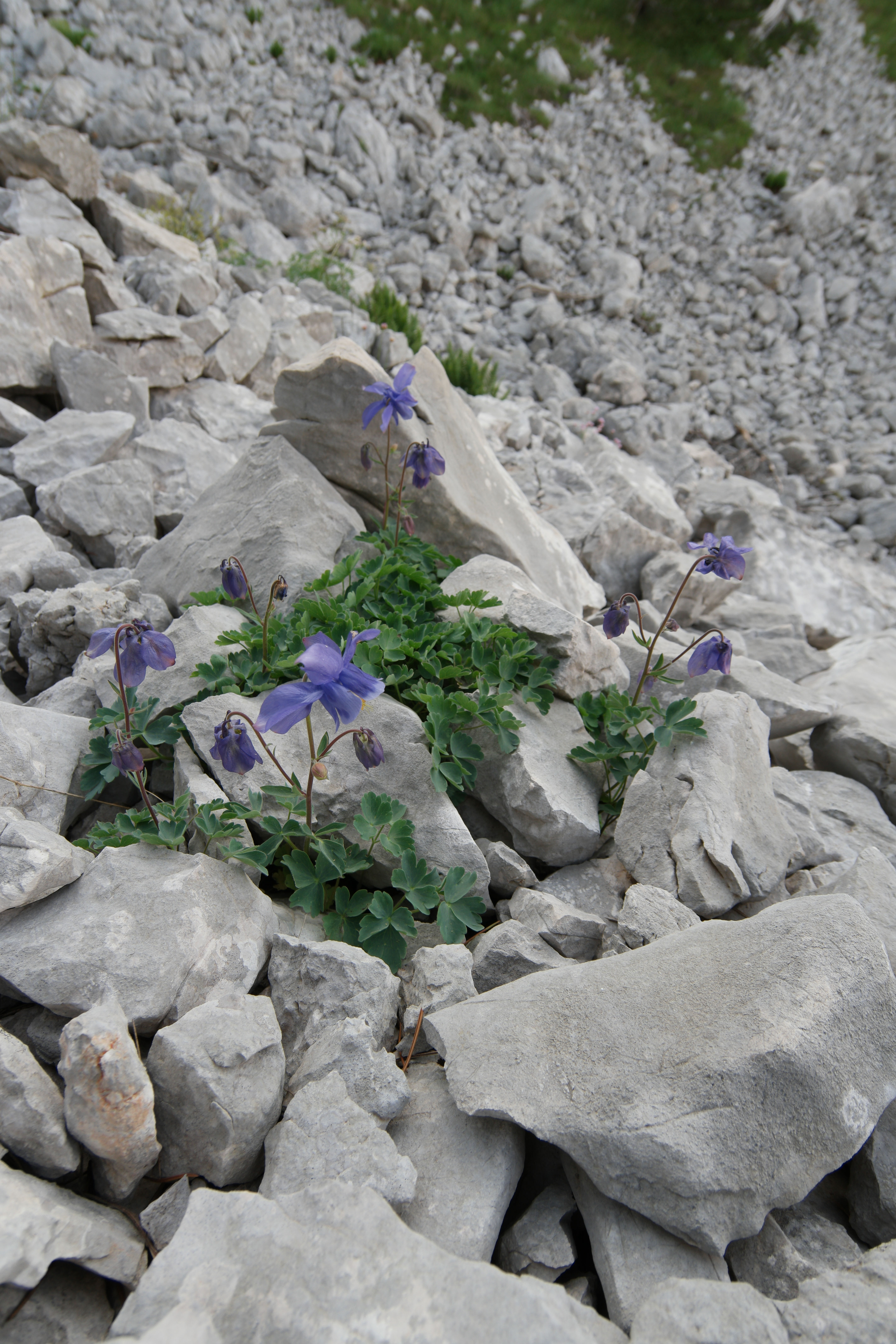
A. dinarica in its natural habitat

== Description ==
The Dinaric columbine grows to 20cm, with blue sepals and white petals sometimes flushed with blue or violet. The basal leaves are ternate, and the leaflets trifid, grey and hairy.

== Habitat ==
It grows primarily in calcareous rocks and scree at altitudes between 1200m and 2100m, and sometimes in snow valleys and snow pits at the edge of coniferous woodland. It is adapted to open habitats, which separates the species ecologically from the sympatric A. grata.
