= List of Campanula species =

Campanula /kæmˈpænjʊlə/ is one of several genera in the family Campanulaceae with the common name bellflower. It takes its name from their bell-shaped flowers – campanula is Latin for "little bell".

According to Plants of the World Online (POWO) the genus Campanula contains 452 species.

== A ==
- Campanula acutiloba Vatke
- Campanula adiyamanensis Yıldırım & Ş.Özcan
- Campanula afganica Pomel
- Campanula afra Cav.
- Campanula aghrica Kit Tan & Sorger
- Campanula aibgica Timukhin & Tuniyev
- Campanula aizoides Zaffan
- Campanula aizoon Boiss. & Spruner
- Campanula ajugifolia Sest. ex Spreng.
- Campanula akguelii Altan
- Campanula akhdarensis A.G.Mill. & Whitc.
- Campanula aktascii Aytaç & H.Duman
- Campanula alaskana (A.Gray) W.Wight ex J.P.Anderson
- Campanula alata Desf.
- Campanula albanica Desf.
- Campanula aldanensis Fed. & Karav.
- Campanula alisan-kilincii Yıldırım & Senol
- Campanula alliariifolia Willd.
- Campanula alpestris All.
- Campanula alphonsii Wall. ex A.DC.
- Campanula alpina Jacq.
- Campanula alsinoides Hook.f. & Thomson
- Campanula amasia Post
- Campanula anchusiflora Sm.
- Campanula andina Rupr.
- Campanula andrewsii A.DC.
- Campanula antalyensis Ayaşlıgil & Kit Tan
- Campanula antilibanotica (P.H.Davis) Greuter & Burdet
- Campanula argentea Lam.
- Campanula argyrotricha Wall. ex A.DC.
- Campanula ariana Podlech
- Campanula aristata Wall.
- Campanula armena Steven
- Campanula arvatica Lag.
- Campanula asperuloides Boiss. & Orph.) Harms
- Campanula atlantis Gattef., Maire & Weiller
- Campanula aureliana Bogdanovic, Resetnik, Brullo & Shuka
- Campanula aurita Greene
- Campanula austroadriatica D.Lakušic & Kovacic
- Campanula austroxinjiangensis Y.K.Yang, J.K.Wu & J.Z.Li
- Campanula autraniana Albov
- Campanula axillaris Boiss. & Balansa

== B ==
- Campanula baborensis Quézel
- Campanula balfourii J.Wagner & Vierh.
- Campanula barbata L.
- Campanula baskilensis Behçet
- Campanula baumgartenii Becker
- Campanula bayerniana Rupr.
- Campanula bellidifolia Adams
- Campanula bergomensis F.Mangili & L.Mangili
- Campanula bertolae Colla
- Campanula betonicifolia Sm.
- Campanula betulifolia K.Koch
- Campanula bipinnatifida P.H.Davis
- Campanula bluemelii Halda
- Campanula bohemica Hruby
- Campanula bononiensis L.
- Campanula bordesiana Maire
- Campanula bornmuelleri Nábelek
- Campanula bravensis (Bolle) A.Chev.
- Campanula broussonetiana Schult.
- Campanula buseri Damboldt

== C ==
- Campanula cabezudoi Cano-Maq. & Talavera
- Campanula calaminthifolia Lam.
- Campanula calcarata Sommier & Levier
- Campanula calcicola W.W.Sm.
- Campanula calycialata V.Randjel. & Zlatkovic
- Campanula camptoclada Boiss.
- Campanula cana Wall.
- Campanula candida A.DC.
- Campanula cantabrica Feer
- Campanula carnica Schiede ex Mert. & W.D.J.Koch
- Campanula carpatha Halácsy
- Campanula carpatica Jacq.
- Campanula cashmeriana Royle
- Campanula caucasica M.Bieb.
- Campanula celsii A.DC.
- Campanula cenisia L.
- Campanula cervicaria L.
- Campanula cespitosa Scop.
- Campanula × chevalieri Sennen
- Campanula choruhensis Kit Tan & Sorger
- Campanula chrysosplenifolia Franch.
- Campanula cichoracea Sm.
- Campanula ciliata Steven
- Campanula cochleariifolia Lam.
- Campanula cochleromena Gardère
- Campanula collina Sims
- Campanula columnaris Contandr., Quézel & Zaffran
- Campanula comosiformis (Hayek & Janch.) Frajman & Schneew.
- Campanula conferta A.DC.
- Campanula constantini Beauverd & Topali
- Campanula coriacea P.H.Davis
- Campanula × cottia Beyer
- Campanula crassipes Heuff.
- Campanula cremnophila Bogdanovic, Resetnik, M.Jericevic, N.Jericevic & Brullo
- Campanula crenulata Franch.
- Campanula cretica (A.DC.) D.Dietr.
- Campanula creutzburgii Greuter
- Campanula crispa Lam.
- Campanula cymaea Phitos
- Campanula cymbalaria Sm.

== D ==
- Campanula daghestanica Fomin
- Campanula damascena Labill.
- Campanula damboldtiana P.H.Davis & Sorger
- Campanula dasyantha M.Bieb.
- Campanula daucoides D.Lakusic, Skondric & Aleksic
- Campanula davisii Turrill
- Campanula decumbens A.DC.
- Campanula delicatula Boiss.
- Campanula demirsoyi Kandemir
- Campanula densiciliata A.Balkr., Harsh Singh, B.Joshi & R.K.Mishra
- Campanula dersimensis Fırat & Yıldırım
- Campanula dichotoma L.
- Campanula dieckii Lange
- Campanula × digenea F.Wettst.
- Campanula dimitrii Strid
- Campanula dimorphantha Schweinf.
- Campanula divaricata Michx.
- Campanula dolomitica E.A.Busch
- Campanula drabifolia Sm.
- Campanula dulcis Decne.
- Campanula dzaaku Albov
- Campanula dzyschrica Kolak.

== E ==
- Campanula edulis Forssk.
- Campanula ekimiana Güner
- Campanula elatines L.
- Campanula elatinoides Moretti
- Campanula engurensis Kharadze
- Campanula erinus L.
- Campanula euboica Phitos
- Campanula euclasta Boiss.
- Campanula eugeniae Fed.
- Campanula excisa Schleich. ex Murith
- Campanula expansa Rudolph

== F ==
- Campanula fastigiata Dufour ex Schult.
- Campanula feijoana Gardère
- Campanula fenestrellata Feer
- Campanula ficarioides Timb.-Lagr.
- Campanula filicaulis Durieu
- Campanula flaccidula Vatke
- Campanula foliosa Ten.
- Campanula formanekiana Degen & Dörfl.
- Campanula forsythii (Arcang.) Bég.
- Campanula fragilis Cirillo
- Campanula fransinea Gardère
- Campanula fritschii Witasek
- Campanula fruticulosa (O.Schwarz & P.H.Davis) Damboldt

== G ==
- Campanula gansuensis L.C.Wang & D.Y.Hong
- Campanula garciniae Pils
- Campanula garganica Ten.
- Campanula gentilis Kovanda
- Campanula giesekiana Vest ex Schult.
- Campanula gilliatii Milne-Redh. & Turrill
- Campanula × gisleri Brügger
- Campanula glomerata L.
- Campanula × glomeratiformis Murr ex Dalla Torre & Sarnth.
- Campanula glomeratoides D.Y.Hong
- Campanula goulimyi Turrill
- Campanula gracillima Podlech
- Campanula grandis Fisch. & C.A.Mey.
- Campanula grossekii Heuff.
- Campanula guinochetii Quézel

== H ==
- Campanula hacerae Ilçim
- Campanula hagielia Boiss.
- Campanula haradjanii Rech.f.
- Campanula hawkinsiana Hausskn. & Heldr.
- Campanula hedgei P.H.Davis
- Campanula hercegovina Degen & Fiala
- Campanula hermannii Rech.f.
- Campanula herminii Hoffmanns. & Link
- Campanula heterophylla L.
- Campanula hieracioides Kolak.
- Campanula hierapetrae Rech.f.
- Campanula hierosolymitana Boiss.
- Campanula hispanica Willk.
- Campanula hissarica Kamelin ex Rassulova
- Campanula hofmannii (Pantan.) Greuter & Burdet
- Campanula hongii Y.F.Deng
- Campanula humillima A.DC.
- Campanula hypopolia Trautv.

== I ==
- Campanula iconia Phitos
- Campanula immodesta Lammers
- Campanula incanescens Boiss.
- Campanula incurva Aucher ex A.DC.
- Campanula intercedens Witasek
- Campanula involucrata Aucher ex A.DC.
- Campanula isaurica Contandr., Quézel & Pamukç.
- Campanula × iserana Kovanda
- Campanula isophylla Moretti

== J ==
- Campanula jacobaea C.Sm. ex Webb
- Campanula jacquinii (Sieber) A.DC.
- Campanula jadvigae Kolak.
- Campanula jaubertiana Timb.-Lagr.
- Campanula jordanovii Ancev & Kovanda
- Campanula jurjurensis Pomel
- Campanula justiniana Witasek

== K ==
- Campanula kachethica Kantsch.
- Campanula kamariana Kyriak., Liveri & Phitos
- Campanula kantschavelii Zagar.
- Campanula karabaghensis Mikheev
- Campanula karadjana Bocquet
- Campanula karakuschensis Grossh.
- Campanula kastellorizana Carlström
- Campanula keniensis Thulin
- Campanula kermanica (Rech.f., Aellen & Esfand.) Rech.f.
- Campanula khorasanica (Rech.f. & Aellen) Rech.f.
- Campanula kiharae Kitam.
- Campanula kirikkoleensis A.A.Donamez & Güner
- Campanula kladniana (Schur) Witasek
- Campanula kolakovskyi Kharadze
- Campanula kolenatiana C.A.Mey. ex Rupr.
- Campanula komarovii Maleev
- Campanula kotschyana A.DC.
- Campanula koyuncui H.Duman
- Campanula kurdistanica Advay & Maroofi

== L ==
- Campanula laciniata L.
- Campanula lactiflora M.Bieb.
- Campanula lamondiae Rech.f.
- Campanula lanata Friv.
- Campanula lasiocarpa Cham.
- Campanula latifolia L.
- Campanula lavrensis (Tocl & Rohlena) Phitos
- Campanula lazica (Boiss. & Balansa) Kharadze
- Campanula leblebicii Yıldırım
- Campanula ledebouriana Trautv.
- Campanula lehmanniana Bunge
- Campanula leucantha Gilli
- Campanula leucoclada Boiss.
- Campanula leucosiphon Boiss. & Heldr.
- Campanula lezgina (Alex.) Kolak. & Serdyuk.
- Campanula lingulata Waldst. & Kit.
- Campanula litvinskajae Ogan.
- Campanula longisepala Podlech
- Campanula longistyla Fomin
- Campanula lourica Boiss.
- Campanula luristanica Freyn
- Campanula lusitanica Loefl.
- Campanula luzhijiangensis Huan C.Wang & T.T.Wang
- Campanula lycica Kit Tan & Sorger
- Campanula lyrata Lam.

== M ==
- Campanula macrochlamys Boiss. & A.Huet
- Campanula macrorhiza J.Gay ex A.DC.
- Campanula macrostachya Waldst. & Kit. ex Willd.
- Campanula macrostyla Boiss. & Heldr.
- Campanula mairei Pau ex Maire
- Campanula malatyaensis Mutlu & Karakus
- Campanula marcenoi Brullo
- Campanula marchesettii Witasek
- Campanula mardinensis Bornm. & Sint.
- Campanula mariae-ceballosiae Fern.Prieto, Arjona, Sanna & Cires
- Campanula martinii F.Fen., Pistarino, Peruzzi & Cellin.
- Campanula massalskyi Fomin
- Campanula matritensis A.DC.
- Campanula medium L.
- Campanula mekongensis Diels ex C.Y.Wu
- Campanula merxmuelleri Phitos
- Campanula micrantha Bertol.
- Campanula microdonta Koidz.
- Campanula microphylloidea D.Y.Hong
- Campanula mirabilis Albov
- Campanula moesiaca Velen.
- Campanula mollis L.
- Campanula monodiana Maire
- Campanula montenegrina I.Jankovic & D.Lakusic
- Campanula monteverdensis Gardère
- Campanula moravica (Spitzn.) Kovanda
- Campanula morettiana Rchb.
- Campanula mugeana Yıldırım
- Campanula munzurensis P.H.Davis
- Campanula × murrii Dalla Torre & Sarnth.
- Campanula myrtifolia Boiss. & Heldr.

== N ==
- Campanula nakaoi Kitam.
- Campanula nejceffii Marinov & Stoyanov
- Campanula nisyria Papatsou & Phitos
- Campanula numidica Durieu
- Campanula nuristanica Rech.f. & Schiman-Czeika

== O ==
- Campanula occidentalis Y.Nyman
- Campanula odontosepala Boiss.
- Campanula oligosperma Damboldt
- Campanula olympica Boiss.
- Campanula omeiensis (Z.Y.Zhu) D.Y.Hong & Z.Yu Li
- Campanula orbelica Pančić
- Campanula oreadum Boiss. & Heldr.
- Campanula oreodoxa Arjmandi & Memariani
- Campanula orphanidea Boiss.
- Campanula ossetica M.Bieb.
- Campanula ovacikensis Yıld.

== P – Q ==
- Campanula pallida Wall.
- Campanula pamphylica (Contandr., Quézel & Pamukç.) Akçiçek & Vural
- Campanula pangea Hartvig
- Campanula papillosa Halácsy ex Maire & Petitm.
- Campanula paradoxa Kolak.
- Campanula parnassica Boiss. & Spruner
- Campanula parryi A.Gray
- Campanula patula L.
- Campanula pelia Hausskn. ex Bedd.
- Campanula pelviformis Lam.
- Campanula pendula M.Bieb.
- Campanula peregrina L.
- Campanula perpusilla A.DC.
- Campanula persepolitana Kotschy ex Boiss.
- Campanula persicifolia L.
- Campanula peshmenii Güner
- Campanula petiolata A.DC.
- Campanula petraea L.
- Campanula petrophila Rupr.
- Campanula phitosiana Yıldırım & Sentürk
- Campanula phrygia Jaub. & Spach
- Campanula phyctidocalyx Boiss. & Noë
- Campanula pichleri Vis.
- Campanula pinatzii Greuter & Phitos
- Campanula pindicola Aldén
- Campanula pinnatifida Hub.-Mor.
- Campanula piperi Howell
- Campanula podocarpa Boiss.
- Campanula pollinensis Podlech
- Campanula polyclada Rech.f. & Schiman-Czeika
- Campanula pontica Albov
- Campanula portenschlagiana Schult.
- Campanula poscharskyana Degen
- Campanula postii (Boiss.) Harms
- Campanula praesignis Beck
- Campanula precatoria Timb.-Lagr.
- Campanula primulifolia Brot.
- Campanula propinqua Fisch. & C.A.Mey.
- Campanula pseudostenocodon Lacaita
- Campanula psilostachya Boiss. & Kotschy
- Campanula ptarmicifolia Lam.
- Campanula pterocaula Hausskn. ex Bornm.
- Campanula pubicalyx (P.H.Davis) Damboldt
- Campanula pulla L.
- Campanula pulvinaris Hausskn. & Bornm.
- Campanula punctata Lam.
- Campanula pyramidalis L.
- Campanula quercetorum Hub.-Mor. & C.Simon

== R ==
- Campanula raddeana Trautv.
- Campanula radicosa Bory & Chaub.
- Campanula radula Fisch. ex Fenzl.
- Campanula raineri Perp.
- Campanula ramosissima Sm.
- Campanula rapunculoides L.
- Campanula rapunculus L.
- Campanula rashtiana Parsa
- Campanula raveyi Boiss.
- Campanula reatina Lucchese
- Campanula rechingeri Phitos
- Campanula reiseri Halácsy
- Campanula retrorsa Labill.
- Campanula reuteriana Boiss. & Balansa
- Campanula rhodensis A.DC.
- Campanula rhomboidalis L.
- Campanula rigescens Pall. ex Schult.
- Campanula rimarum Boiss.
- Campanula robertsonii Gamble
- Campanula romanica Săvul.
- Campanula rosmarinifolia Kerr
- Campanula rotata D.Y.Hong
- Campanula rotundifolia L.
- Campanula rubasensis Teimurov & Taisumov
- Campanula rumeliana (Hampe) Vatke
- Campanula rupestris Sm.
- Campanula rupicola Boiss. & Spruner
- Campanula ruscinonensis Timb.-Lagr.

== S ==
- Campanula sabatia De Not.
- Campanula samothracica (Degen) Greuter & Burdet
- Campanula saonissia Biel & Kit Tan
- Campanula sarmatica Ker Gawl.
- Campanula sartorii Boiss. & Heldr.
- Campanula sauvagei Quézel
- Campanula saxatilis L.
- Campanula saxifraga M.Bieb.
- Campanula saxifragoides Doum.
- Campanula saxonorum Gand.
- Campanula scabrella Engelm.
- Campanula scheuchzeri Vill.
- Campanula schimaniana Rech.f.
- Campanula sciathia Phitos
- Campanula sclerophylla (Kolak.) Ogan.
- Campanula sclerotricha Boiss.
- Campanula scoparia (Boiss. & Hausskn.) Damboldt
- Campanula scopelia Phitos
- Campanula scouleri Hook. ex A.DC.
- Campanula scutellata Griseb.
- Campanula secundiflora Vis. & Pancic
- Campanula × segusina Beyer
- Campanula semisecta Murb.
- Campanula seraglio Kit Tan & Sorger
- Campanula serhouchenensis Dobignard
- Campanula serrata (Kit. ex Schult.) Hendrych
- Campanula shetleri Heckard
- Campanula sibirica L.
- Campanula sidoniensis Boiss. & C.I.Blanche
- Campanula silifkeensis Tezcan & Öztekin
- Campanula simulans Carlström
- Campanula sivasica Kit Tan & Yıldız
- Campanula skanderbegii Bogdanovic, Brullo & D.Lakušic
- Campanula songutica Amirkh.
- Campanula sparsa Friv.
- Campanula spatulata Sm.
- Campanula speciosa Pourr.
- Campanula specularioides Coss.
- Campanula spicata L.
- Campanula × spryginii Saksonov & Tzvelev
- Campanula staintonii Rech.f. & Schiman-Czeika
- Campanula stellaris Boiss.
- Campanula stenocarpa Trautv. & C.A.Mey.
- Campanula stenocodon Boiss. & Reut.
- Campanula stenosiphon Boiss. & Heldr.
- Campanula stevenii M.Bieb.
- Campanula stricta L.
- Campanula strigillosa Boiss.
- Campanula strigosa Banks & Sol.
- Campanula suanetica Rupr.
- Campanula sulaimanii Nasir
- Campanula sulphurea Boiss.
- Campanula sylvatica Wall.

== T – U ==
- Campanula tanfanii Podlech
- Campanula tatrae Borbás
- Campanula telephioides Boiss. & Hausskn.
- Campanula telmessi Hub.-Mor. & Phitos
- Campanula tenuissima Dunn
- Campanula teucrioides Boiss.
- Campanula teutana Bogdanovic & Brullo
- Campanula thyrsoides L.
- Campanula tokurii Ocak
- Campanula tomentosa Lam.
- Campanula tommasiniana K.Koch
- Campanula topaliana Beauverd
- Campanula trachelium L.
- Campanula trachyphylla Schott & Kotschy ex Boiss.
- Campanula transsilvanica Schur ex Andrae
- Campanula transtagana R.Fern.
- Campanula trichocalycina Ten.
- Campanula trichopoda Boiss.
- Campanula tridentata Schreb.
- Campanula tristis Kitam.
- Campanula troegerae Damboldt
- Campanula trojanensis Kovanda & Ancev
- Campanula × truedingeri Murr
- Campanula tubulosa Lam.
- Campanula tymphaea Hausskn.
- Campanula uyemurae (Kudô) Miyabe & Tatew.

== V ==
- Campanula vaillantii Quézel
- Campanula vardariana Bocquet
- Campanula velata Pomel
- Campanula velebitica Borbás
- Campanula veneris Carlström
- Campanula versicolor Andrews
- Campanula vicinituba Gardère
- Campanula vidalii H.C.Watson

== W – X ==
- Campanula waldsteiniana Schult.
- Campanula wanneri Rochel
- Campanula wattiana B.K.Nayar & Babu
- Campanula willkommii Witasek
- Campanula witasekiana Vierh.
- Campanula xylocarpa Kovanda

== Y – Z ==
- Campanula yaltirikii H.Duman
- Campanula yildirimlii Kit Tan & Sorger
- Campanula yunnanensis D.Y.Hong
- Campanula zangezura (Lipsky) Kolak. & Serdyuk.
