= Campanula erinoides =

Campanula erinoides can refer to the following plant species:

- Campanula erinoides L., a synonym of Campanula lusitanica Loefl.
- Campanula erinoides Cav., also a synonym of Campanula lusitanica Loefl.
- Campanula erinoides Muhl., a synonym of Palustricodon aparinoides (Pursh) Morin
