= Margaret Roscoe =

English botanical illustrator and author

- Born: 1787
- Died: 1840 (aged 52–53)
- Occupations: Scientific Illustrator and author
- Known for: Work with Botanical Art
- Spouse: Edward Roscoe
- Children: Edward Henry Roscoe, Margaret Sandbach
- Parent(s): Margaret Griffies and John Lace
- Relatives: Thomas Griffiths Lace, Martha Lace, Mary Ann Dixon, Frances Pearson, Jane Lace, Joshua Lace, Ambrose Lace

Margaret Roscoe (née Lace c. 1786 – 1840) was an early 19th-century English botanical illustrator and writer. She was a mother to Margaret Sandbach and wife to Edward Roscoe.

== Work ==
Roscoe illustrated plates in William Roscoe's botanical work Monandrian Plants of the Order Scitamineae: Chiefly Drawn from Living Specimens in the Botanical Gardens at Liverpool. Her sister Mrs James Dixon also illustrated this botanical work. She went on to write and illustrate Floral Illustrations of the Seasons. A plate from this work was displayed in the 2012 exhibition "Portraits of a Garden, Brooklyn Botanic Garden Florilegium" held at the Hunt Institute for Botanical Documentation.

Roscoe's work Floral Illustrations of the Seasons was engraved by master aquatintist Robert Havell. This book has 55 pages filled with illustrations both hand colored and printed.

She went on to talk about her premise behind the book:

“There is no pursuit which fills the mind with more noble and exalted sentiments than the study of these works of Nature. To her own sex, to whose particular notice she offers it, she trusts it may prove a useful and correct guide to their tastes, both in their selection for a flower garden, and as objects for their pencil.”

Roscoe died in 1840. A memorial sculpture commemorating Roscoe and her husband was undertaken by sculptor John Gibson. This monument can be seen at the Ullet Road Unitarian Church in Liverpool.

The standard author abbreviation M.Roscoe is used to indicate this person as the author when citing a botanical name.

== Family ==
Roscoe was the daughter of Margaret Griffies and her husband, John Lace, an attorney from Liverpool. Roscoe married her second-cousin Edward Roscoe, the son of William Roscoe in 1810. They had two sons, one of whom died in infancy, the other named Edward Henry Roscoe. They also had a daughter, the poet and novelist Margaret Sandbach. Margaret Sandbach lived from 1812 to 1852.

In addition to Margaret Roscoe, Margaret Griffies and John Lace had an additional 7 children, Thomas Griffiths Lace, Martha Lace, Mary Ann Dixon, Frances Pearson, Jane Lace, Joshua Lace, and Ambrose Lace.

== Hope: Monument to Edward and Margaret Roscoe ==
John Gibson, an 18th-century artist, dedicated a plaster relief sculpture, which he named "Hope" in honor of Edward and Margaret.

== Gallery 1 ==
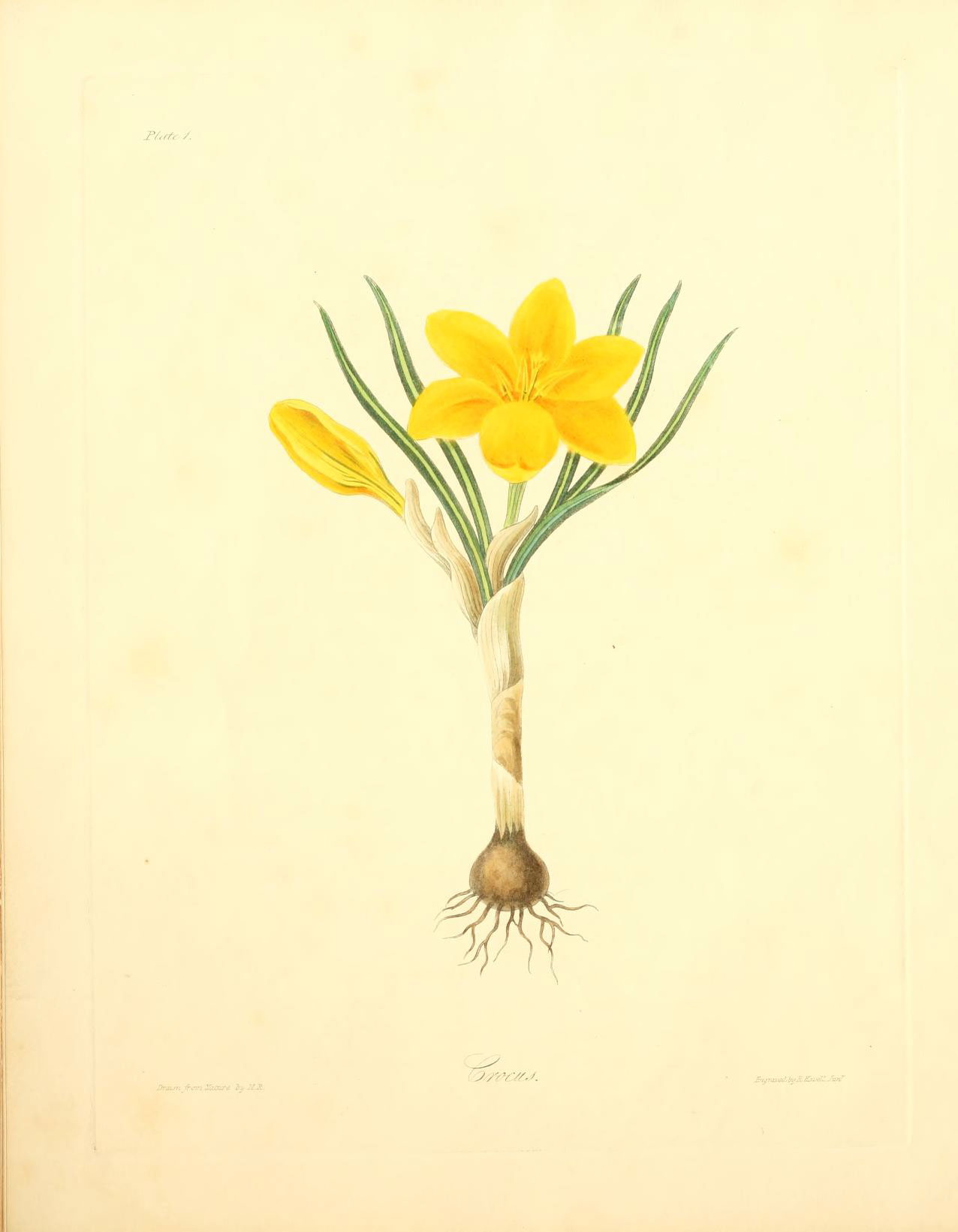
Crocus flavus

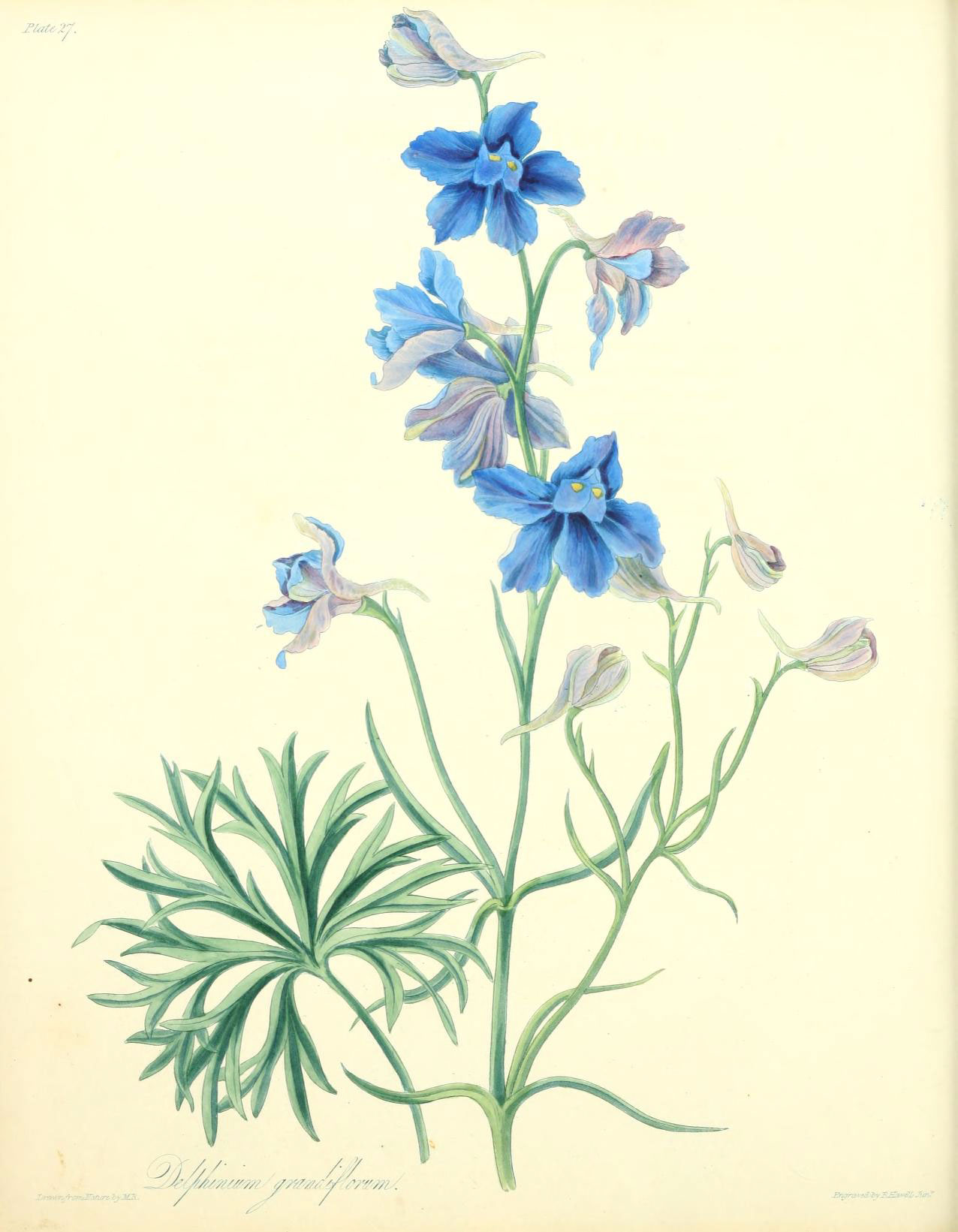
Delphinium grandiflorum

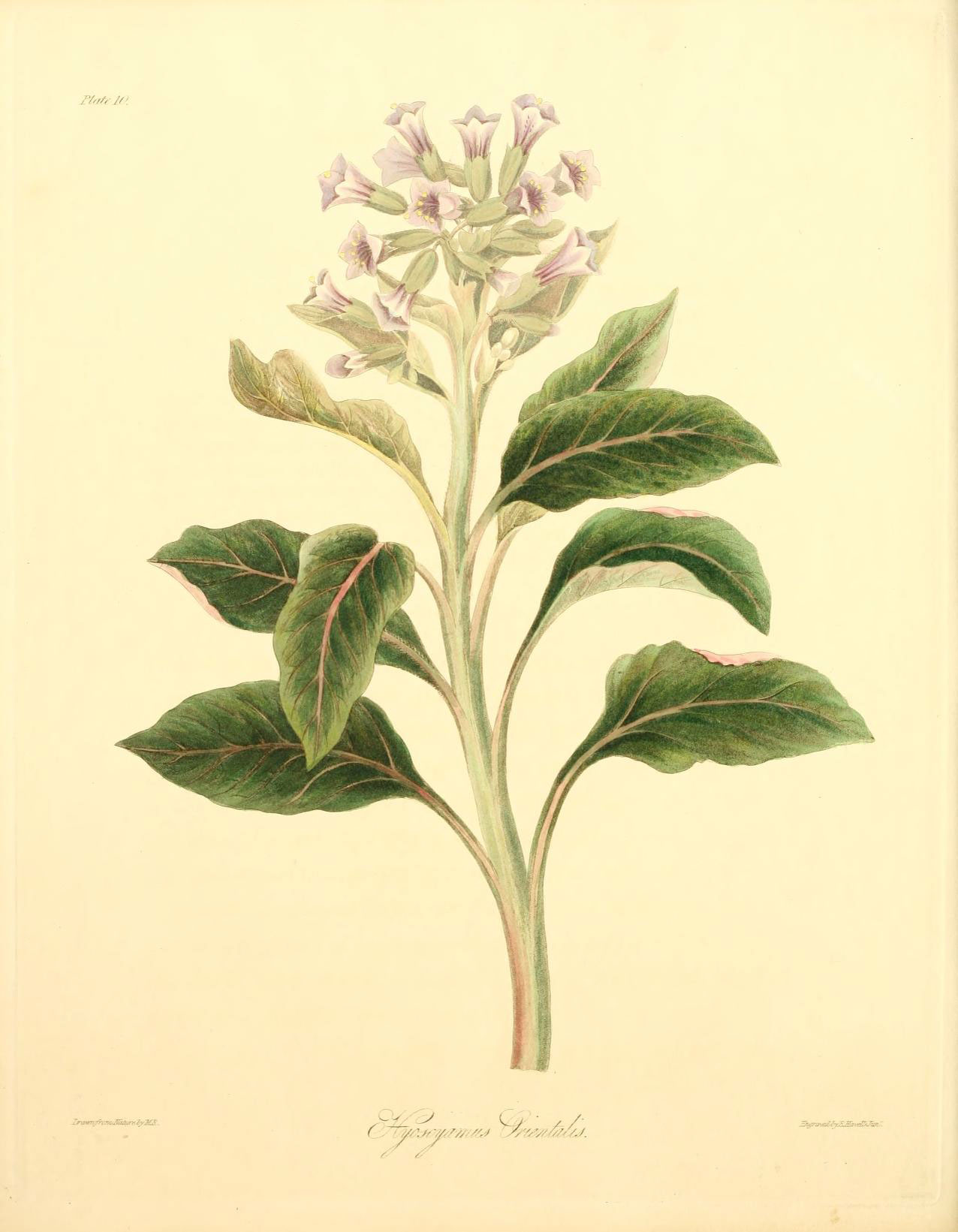
Physochlaina orientalis

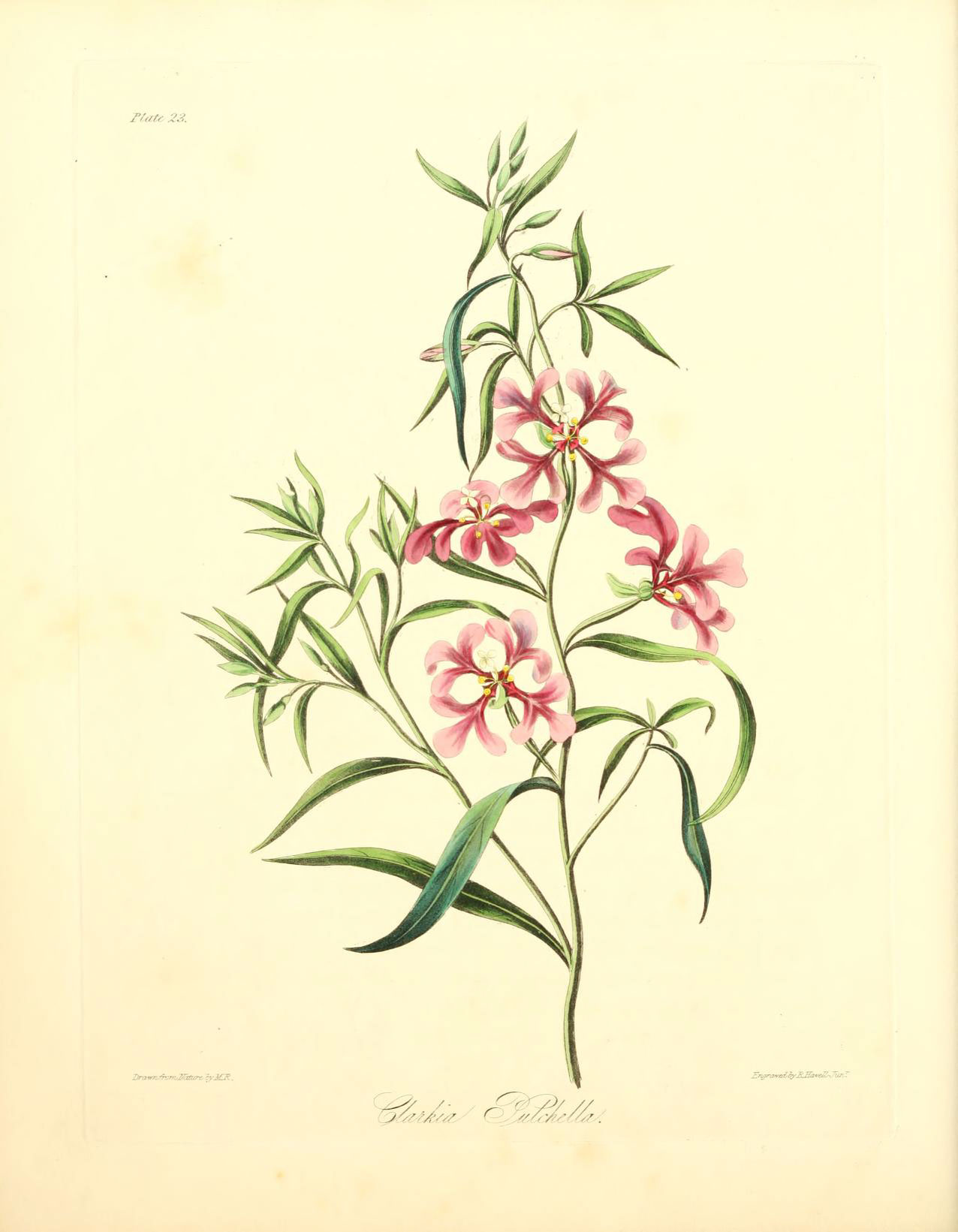
Clarkia pulchella

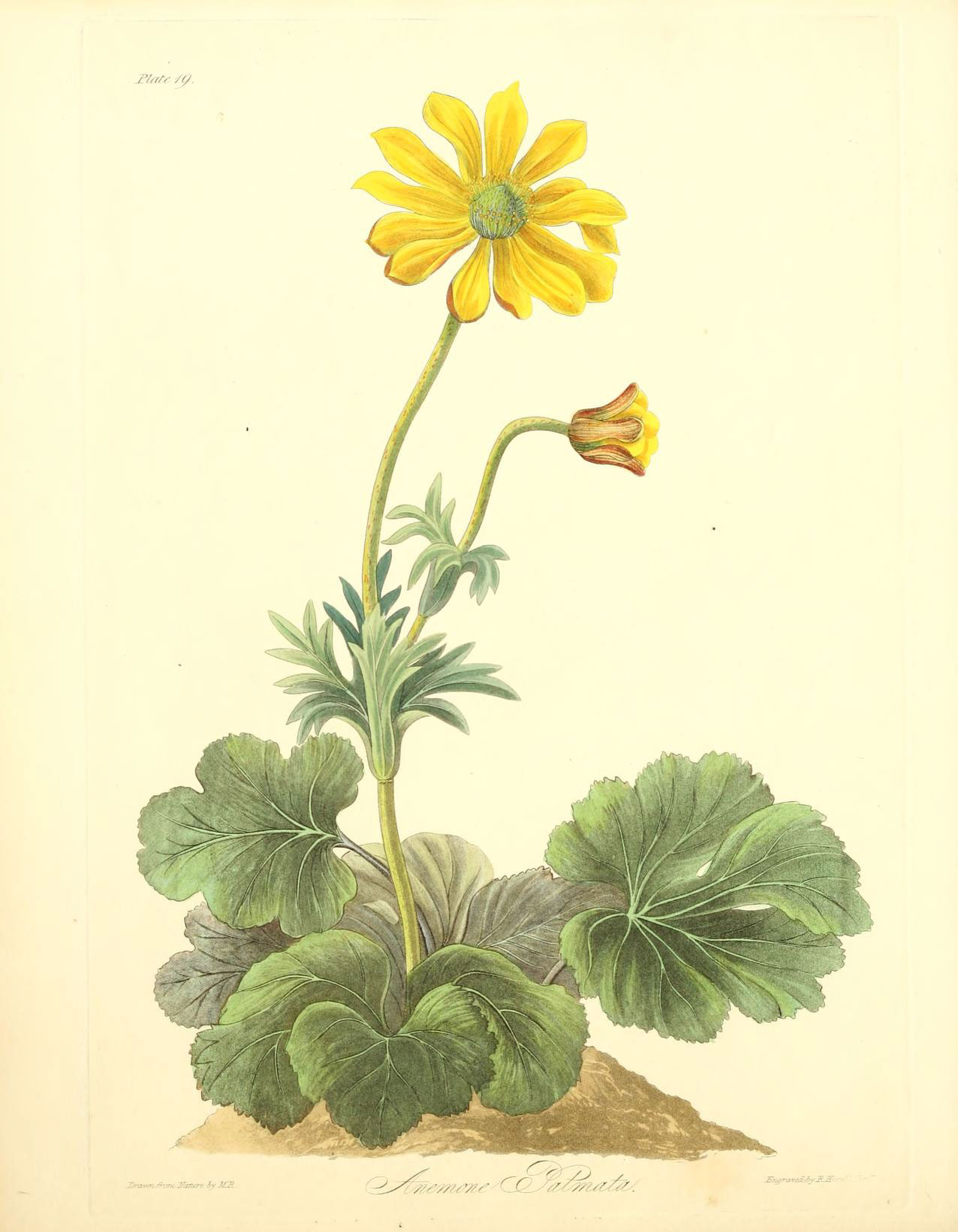
Anemone palmata

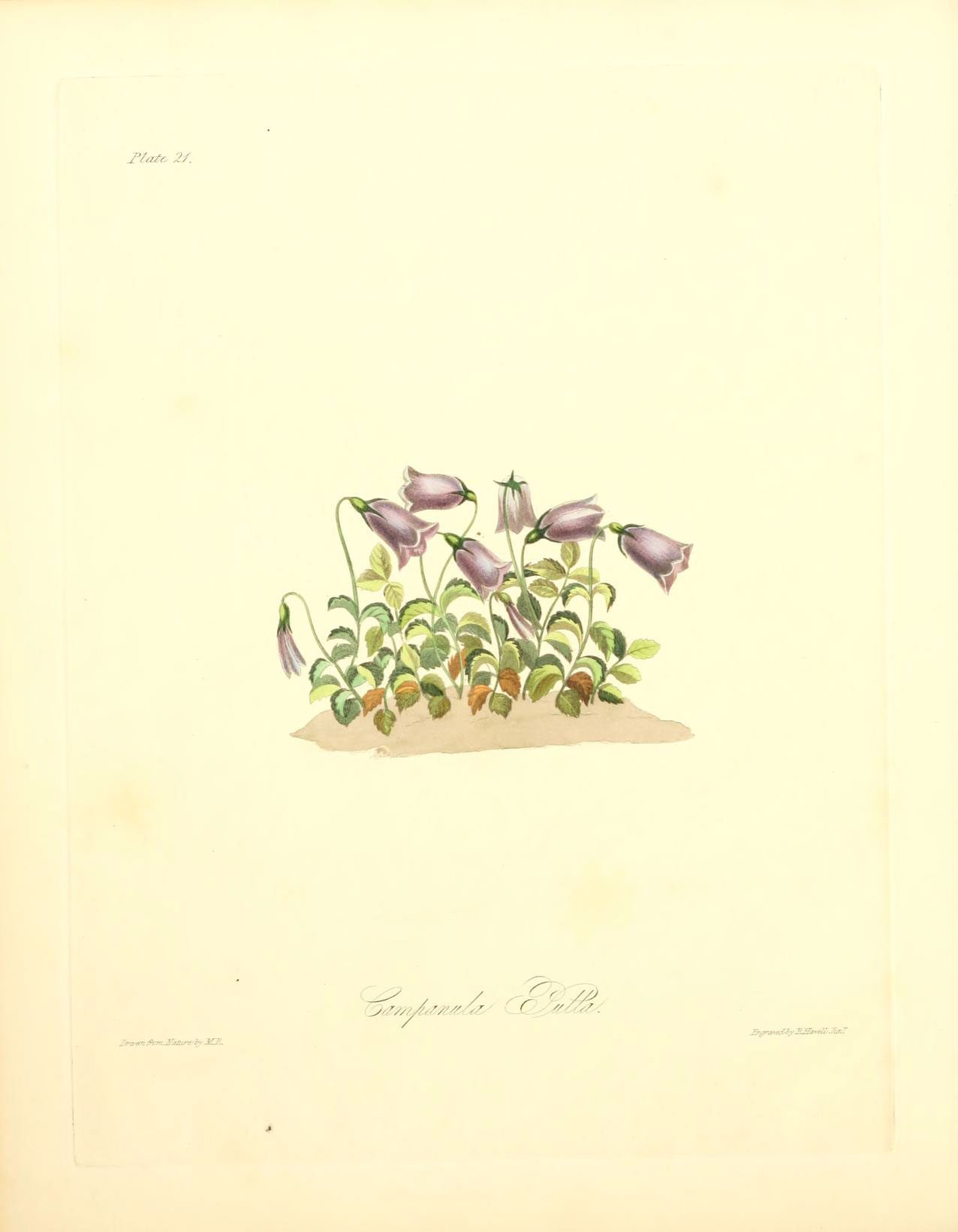
Campanula pulla

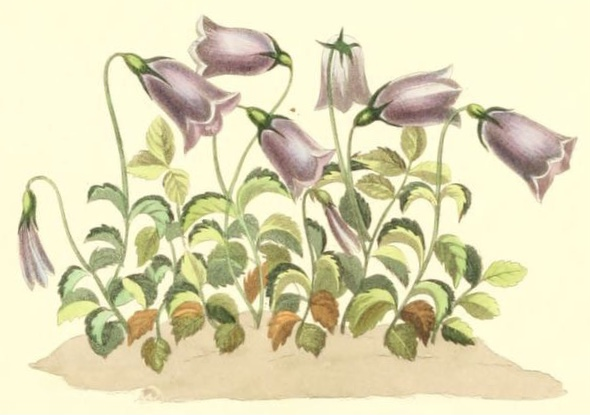
Campanula pulla detail

== Gallery 2 ==
Juxtaposition of images of faded original plates with photographs of the plant species depicted in them and images of plates subsequently re-balanced to correspond to natural colouration of plant species involved.

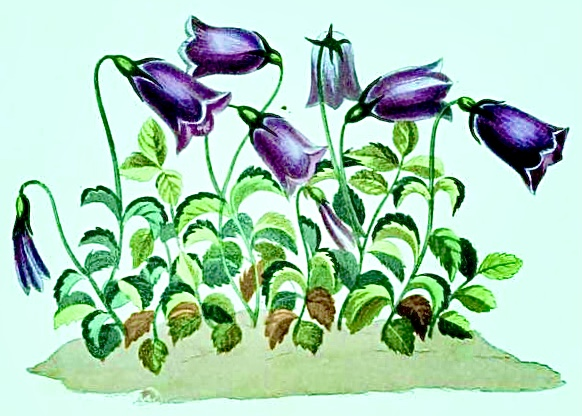
Detail of Plate 21 Campanula pulla, colour-adjusted for natural tones

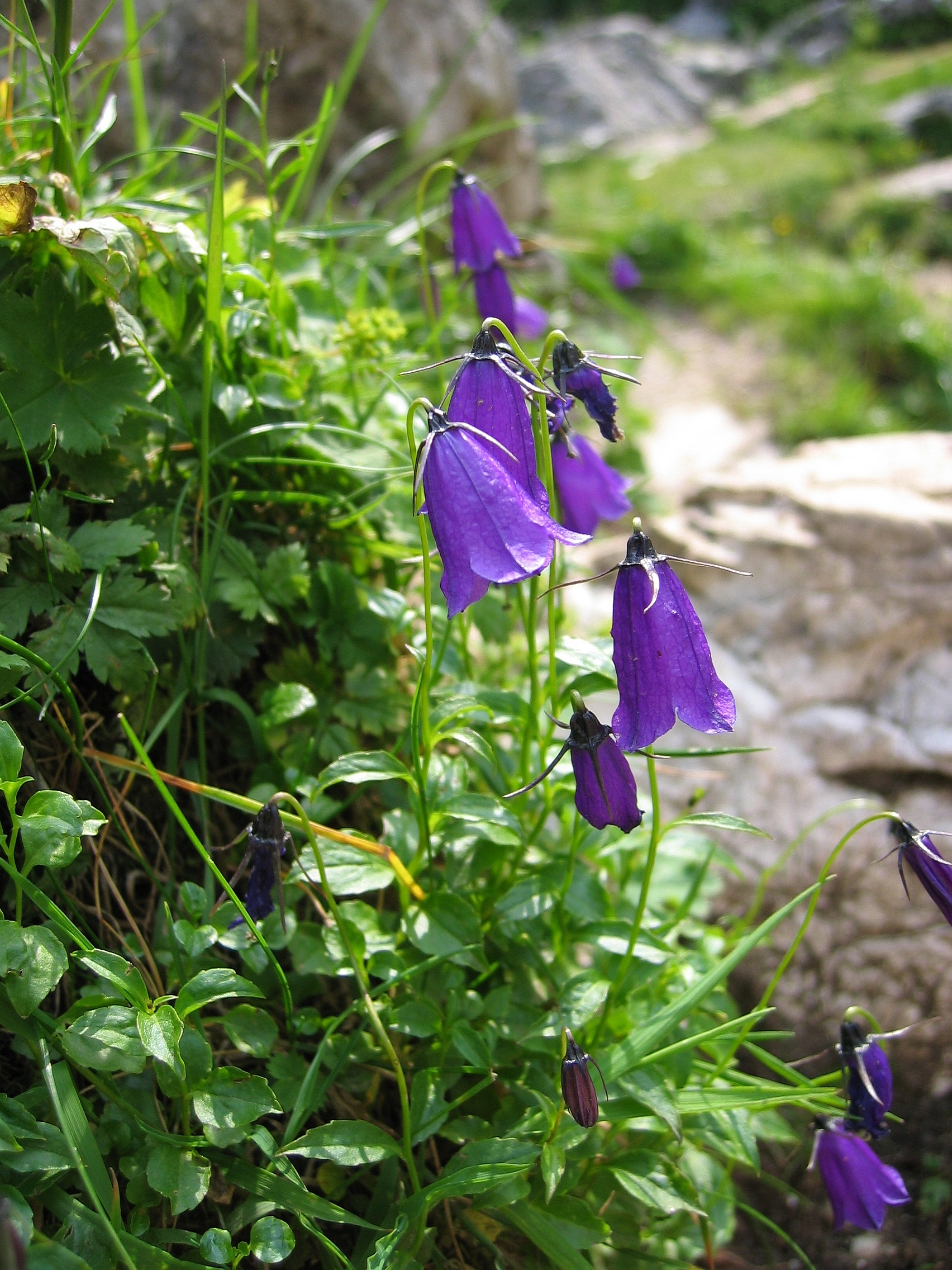
Campanula pulla

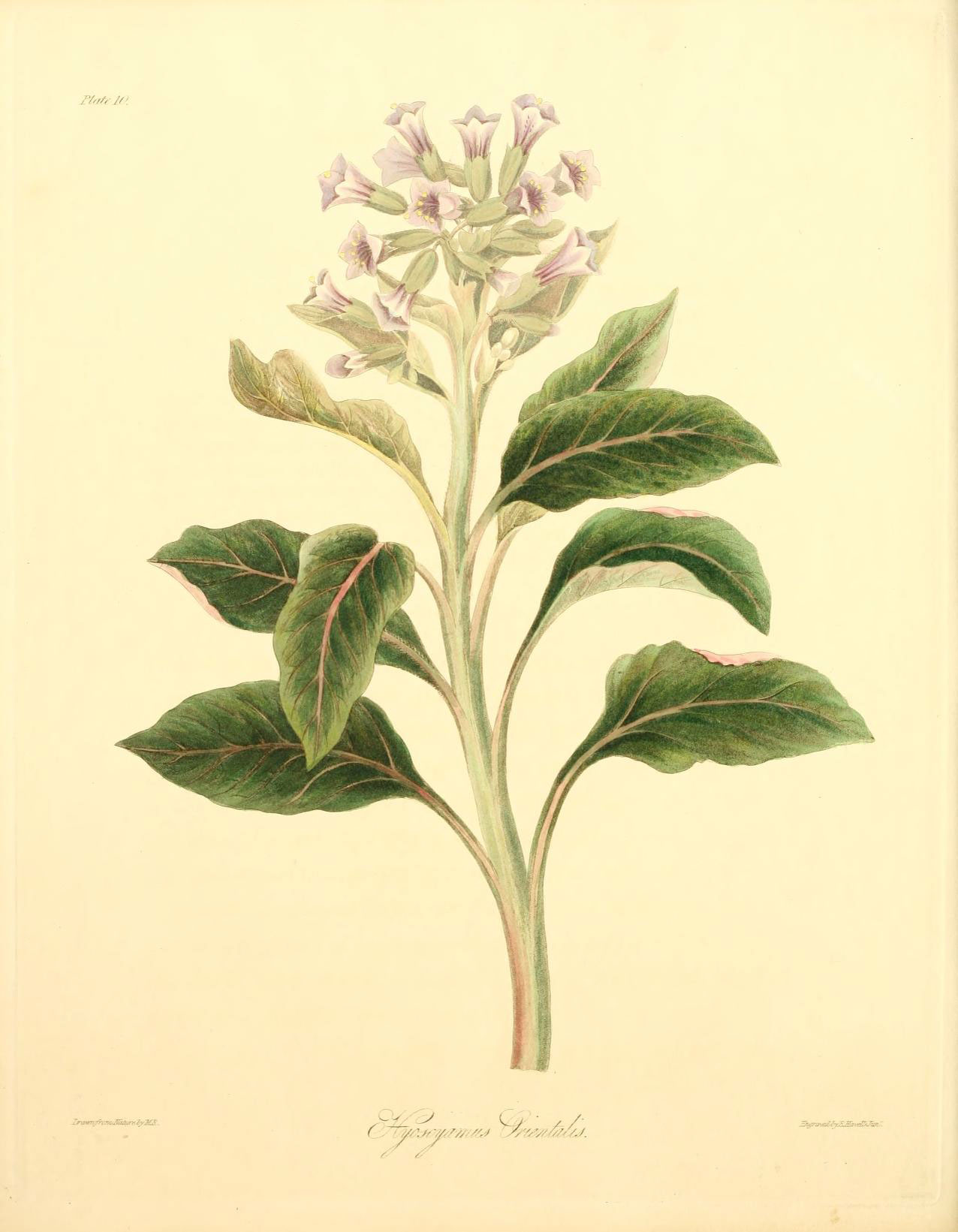
Faded original Plate 10 Physochlaina orientalis (syn.Hyoscyamus orientalis)

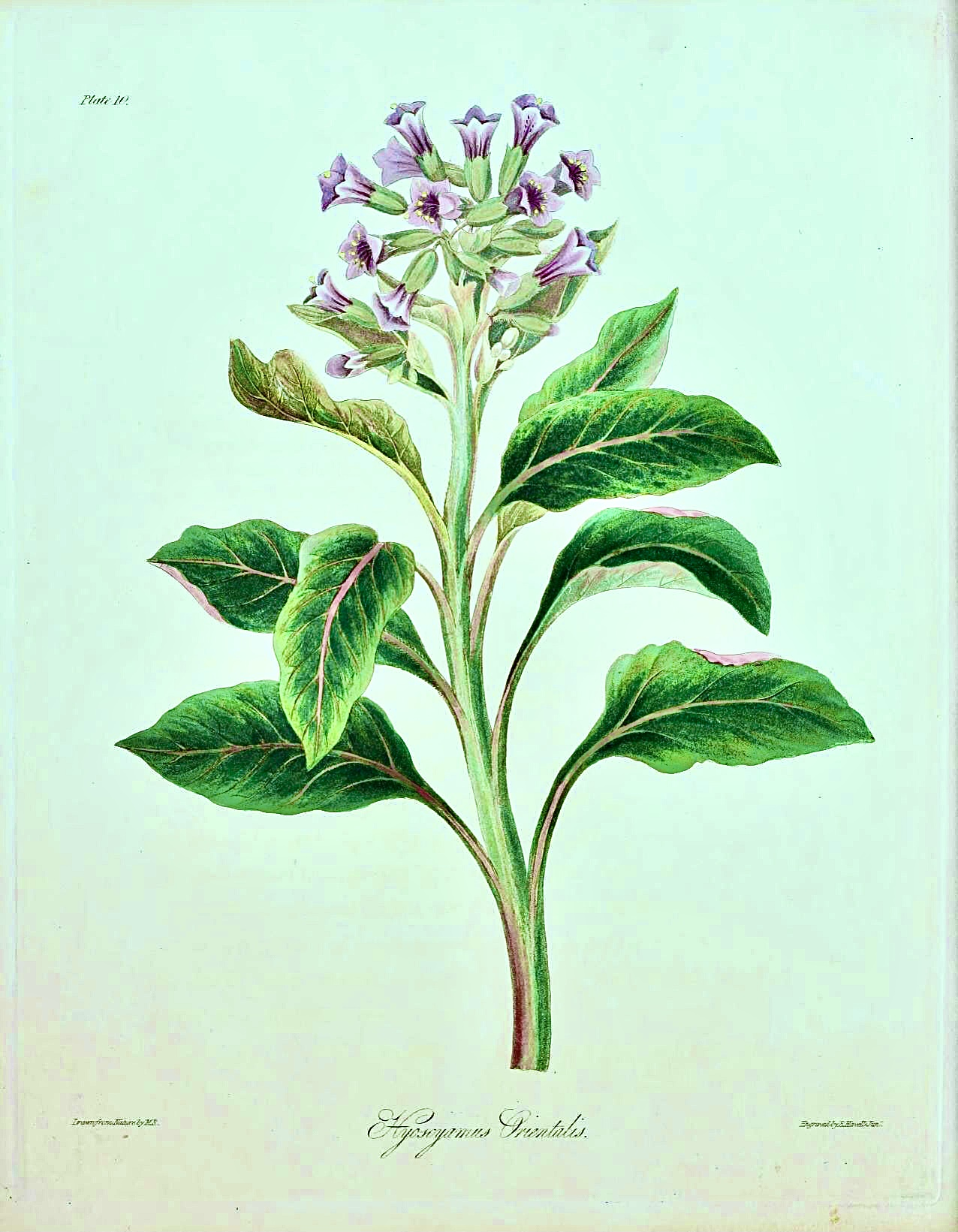
Plate 10, colour-adjusted

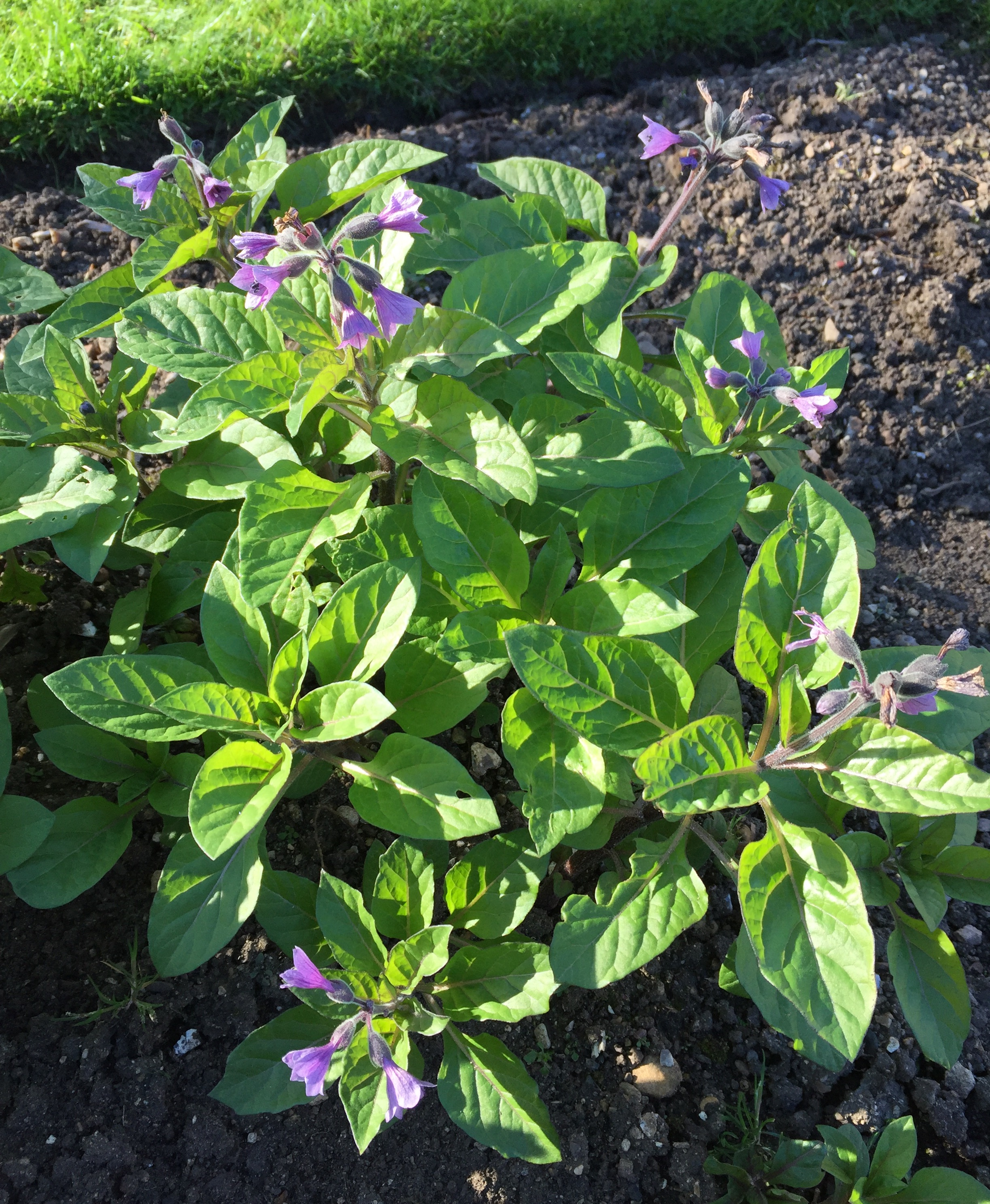
Physochlaina orientalis
