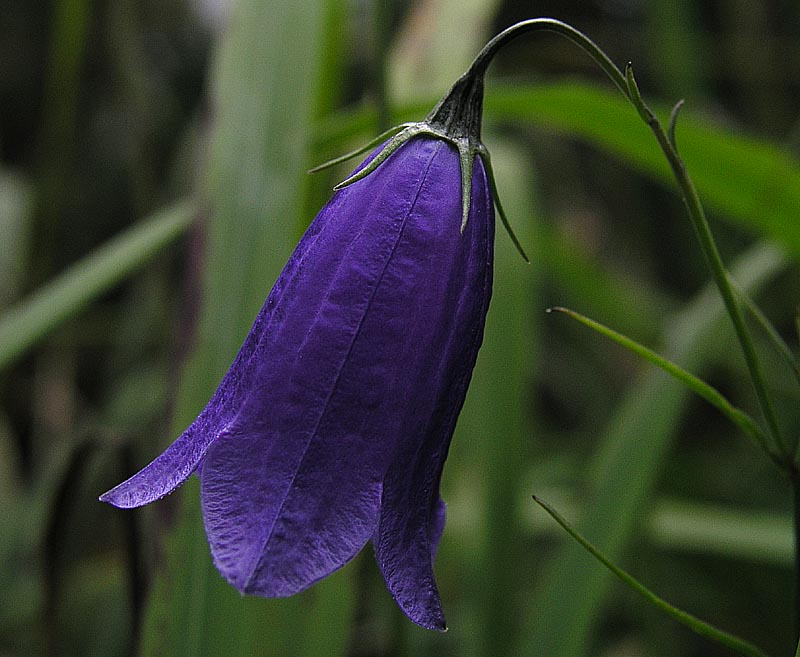
- Close-up of flower
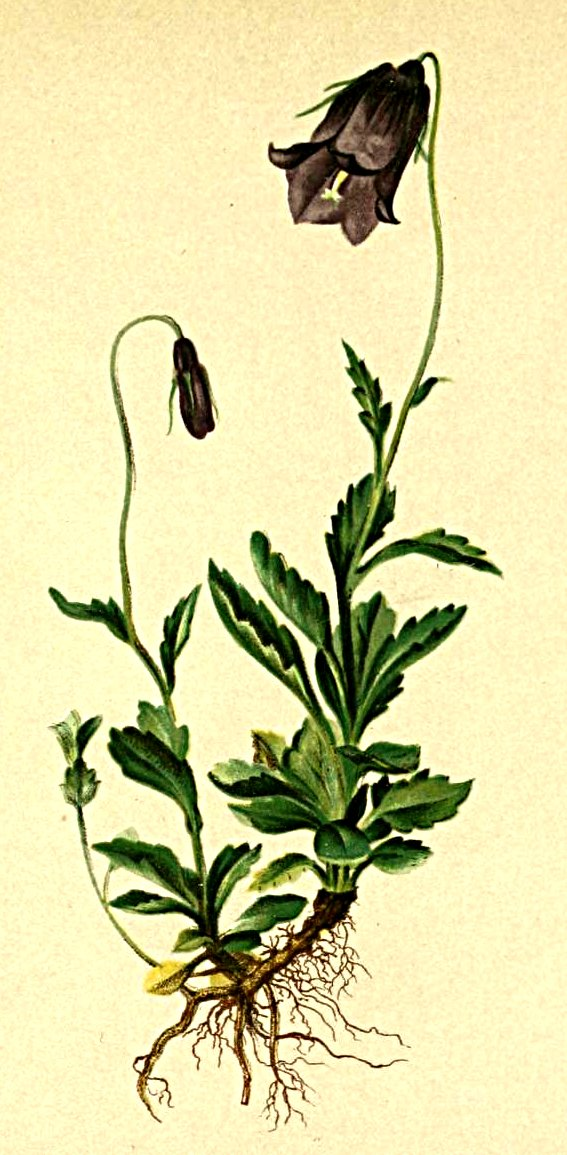
- Botanical illustration

Scientific classification
- Kingdom: Plantae
- Clade: Tracheophytes
- Clade: Angiosperms
- Clade: Eudicots
- Clade: Asterids
- Order: Asterales
- Family: Campanulaceae
- Genus: Campanula
- Species: C. pulla

Binomial name
- Campanula pulla L.

Synonyms
- Campanula macrocalyx Schur; Campanula pseudopulla Schur; Campanula pulla var. pseudopulla (Schur) Nyman; Campanula pulla var. ramosa A.DC.

= Campanula pulla =

Species of plant

Campanula pulla, the solitary harebell, is a species of flowering plant in the family Campanulaceae, native to the northeastern Alps of Austria. A spreading, mat-forming perennial, the Royal Horticultural Society recommends it for scree gardens. It is available from commercial suppliers. There appear to be cultivars or selections; 'Blue Drops' and 'Alba', and a hybrid with Campanula carpatica; Campanula × pulloides, which itself has cultivars, 'Jelly Bells', and 'G.F. Wilson', which has gained the RHS Award of Garden Merit.

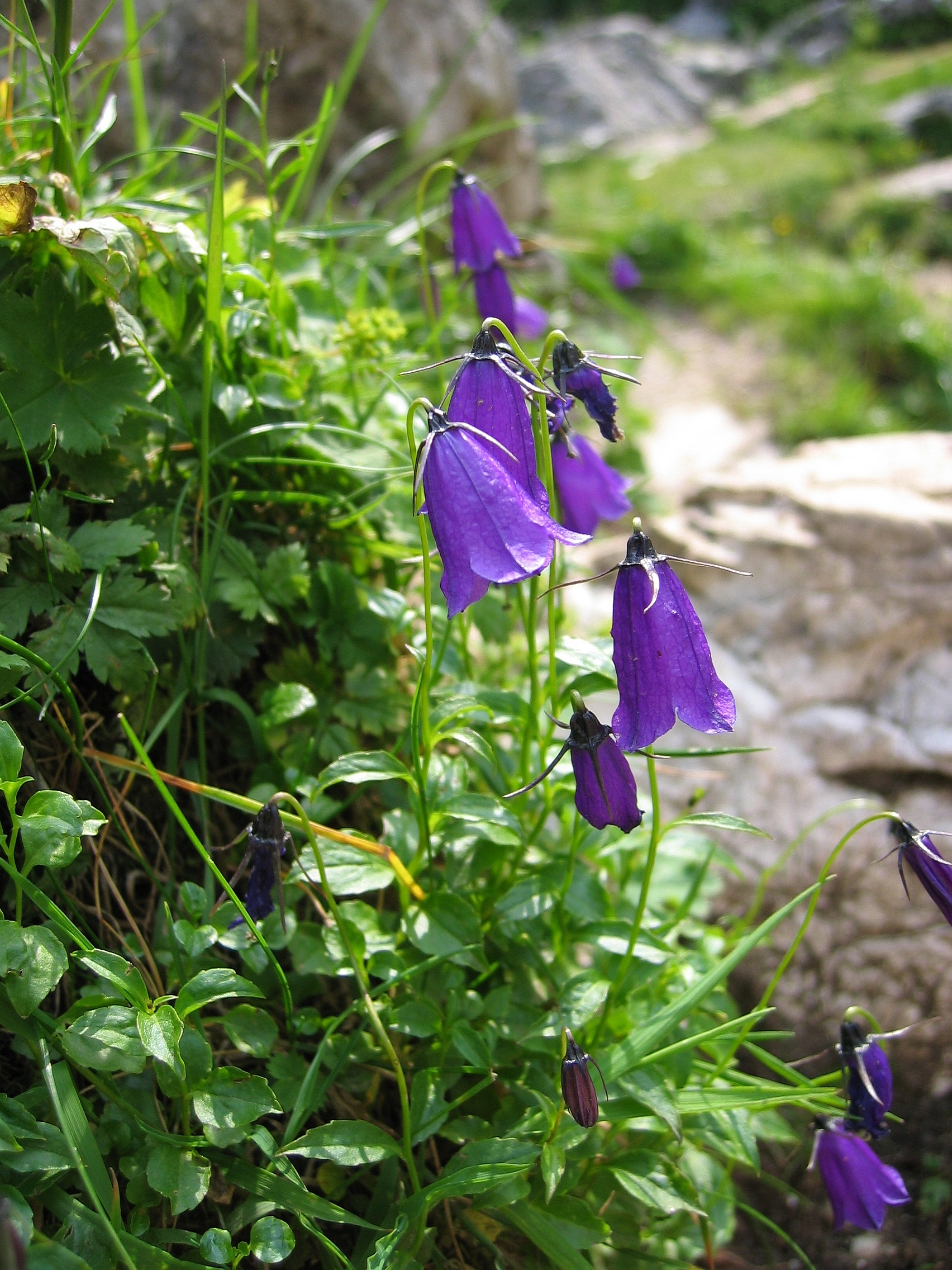
Habit

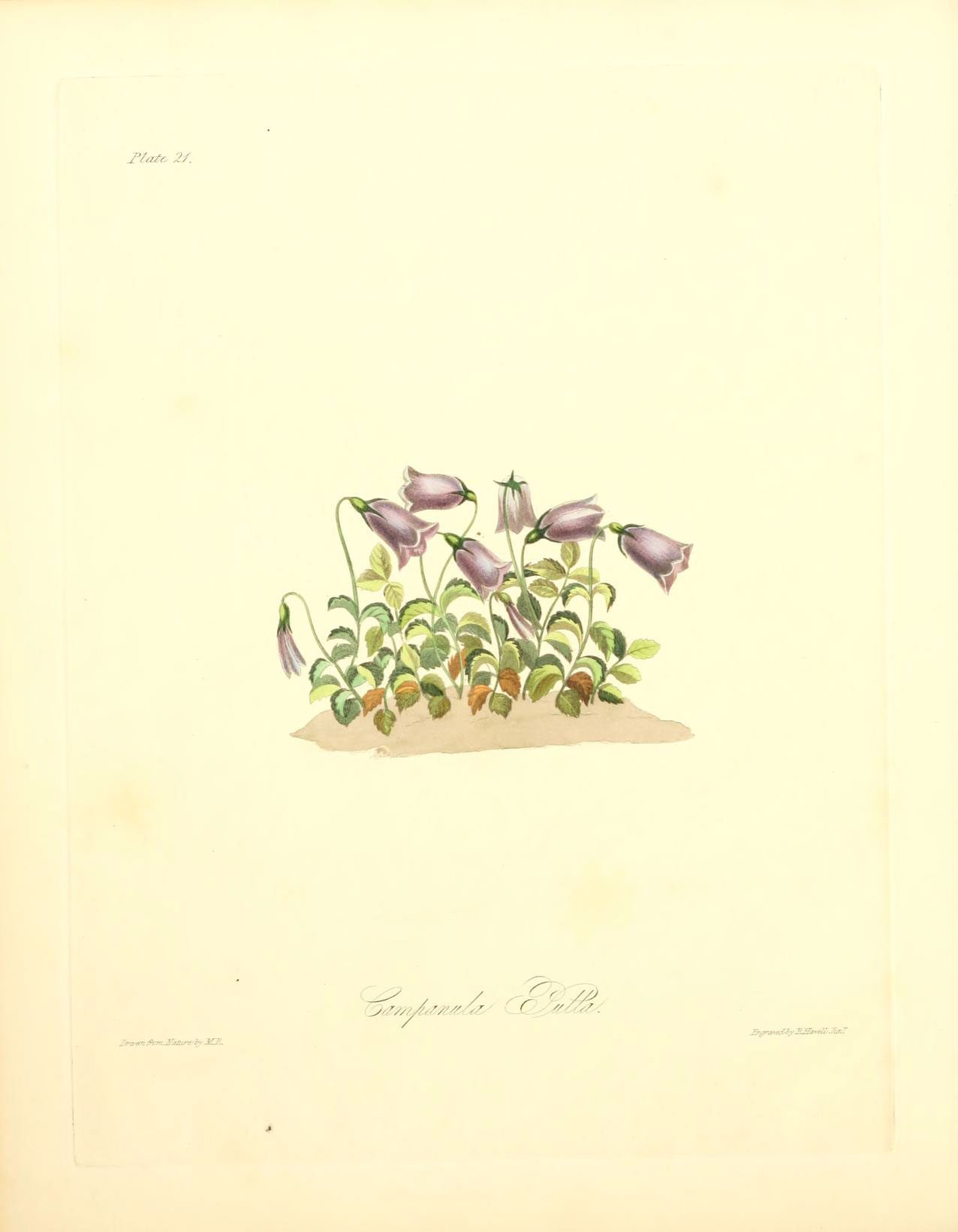
Illustration by Margaret Roscoe

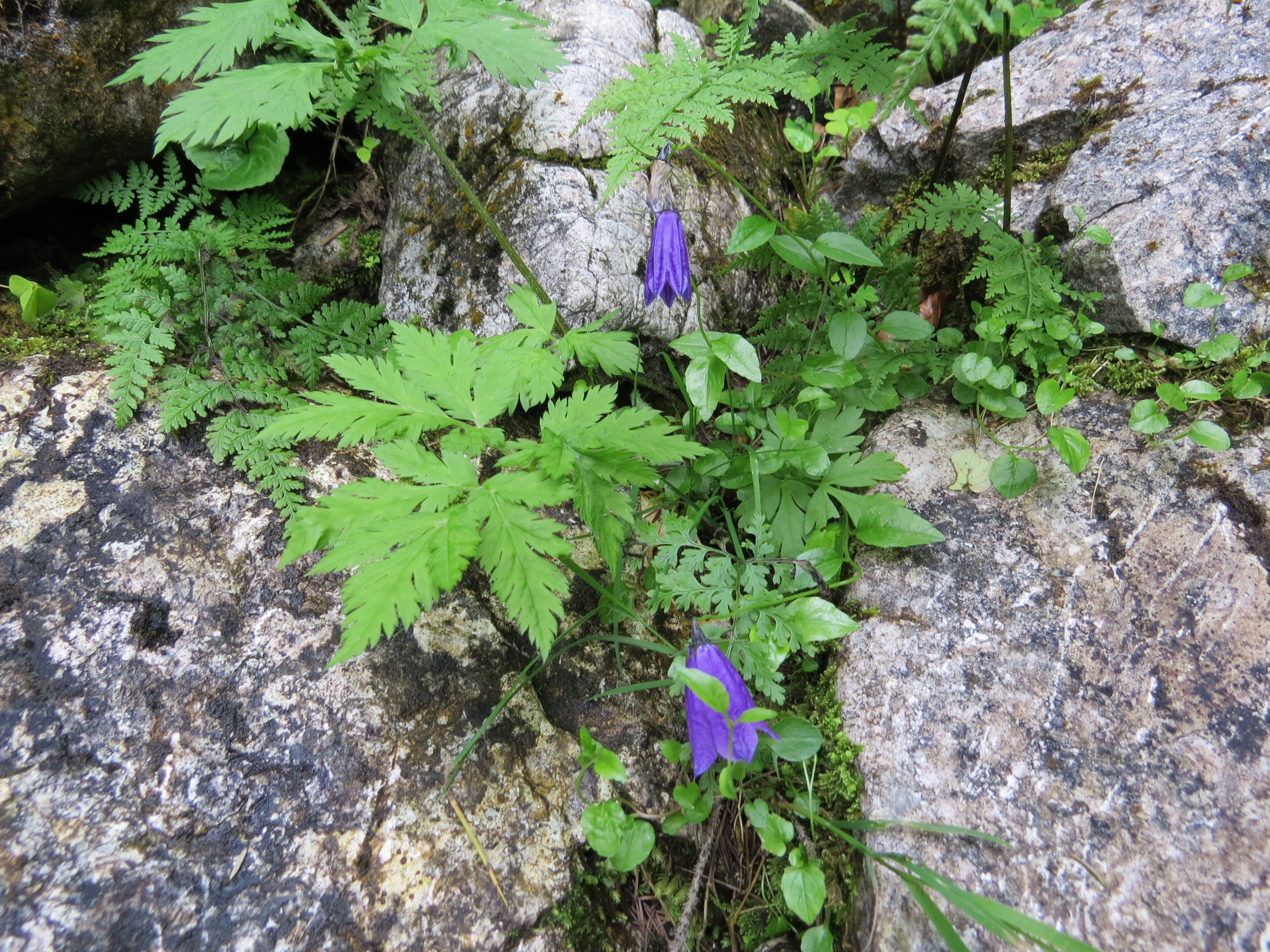
Here labeled as dark bellflower
