= Campanula lyrata =

Scientific classification
- Kingdom: Plantae
- Clade: Tracheophytes
- Clade: Angiosperms
- Clade: Eudicots
- Clade: Asterids
- Order: Asterales
- Family: Campanulaceae
- Genus: Campanula
- Species: C. lyrata

Binomial name
- Campanula lyrata Lam.

Species of plant

Campanula lyrata is a species of bellflower that occurs in the east-Aegean islands and Turkey.

== Uses ==
Extracts from Campanula lyrata have anti-inflammatory wound healing properties
