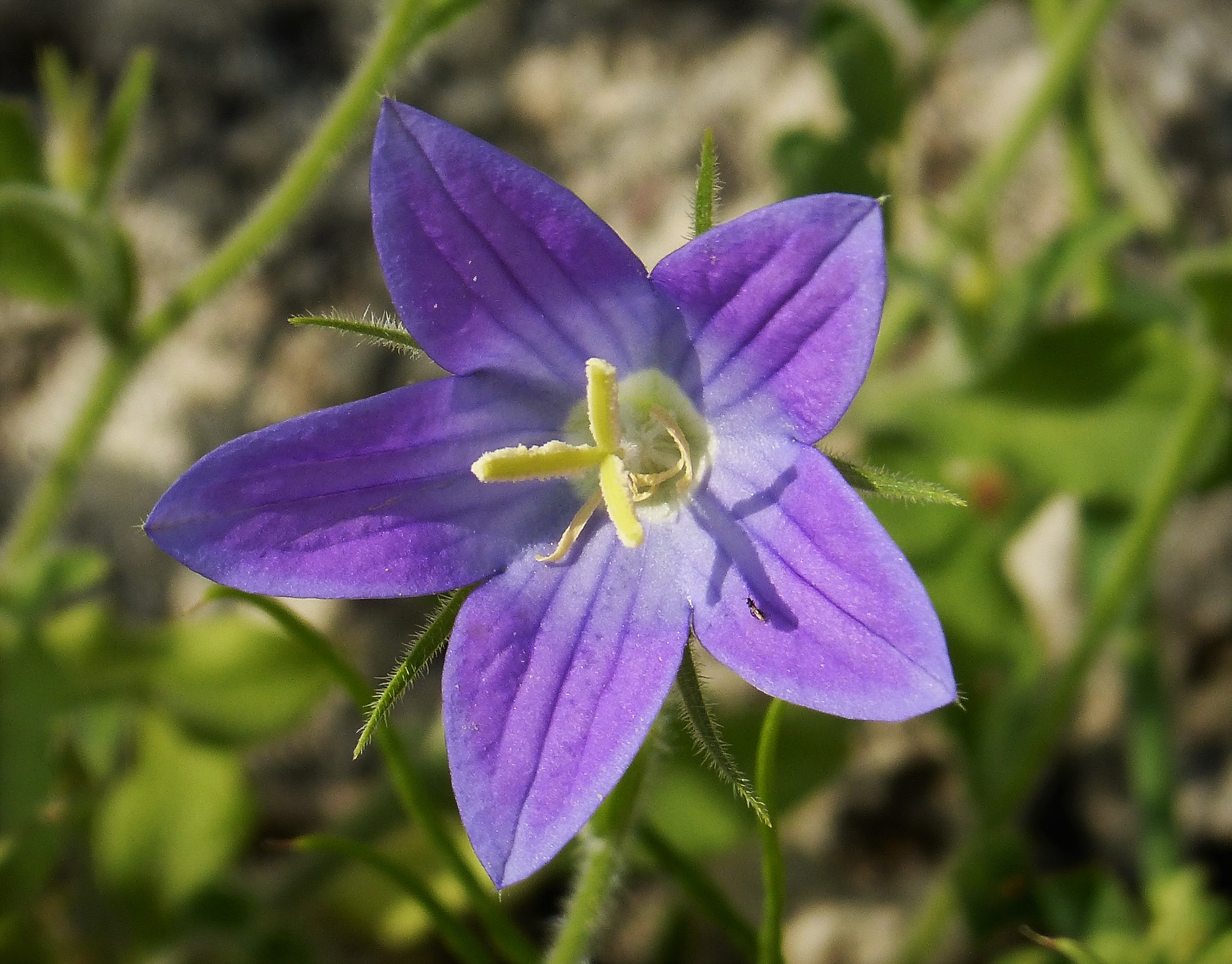
- Close-up of flower
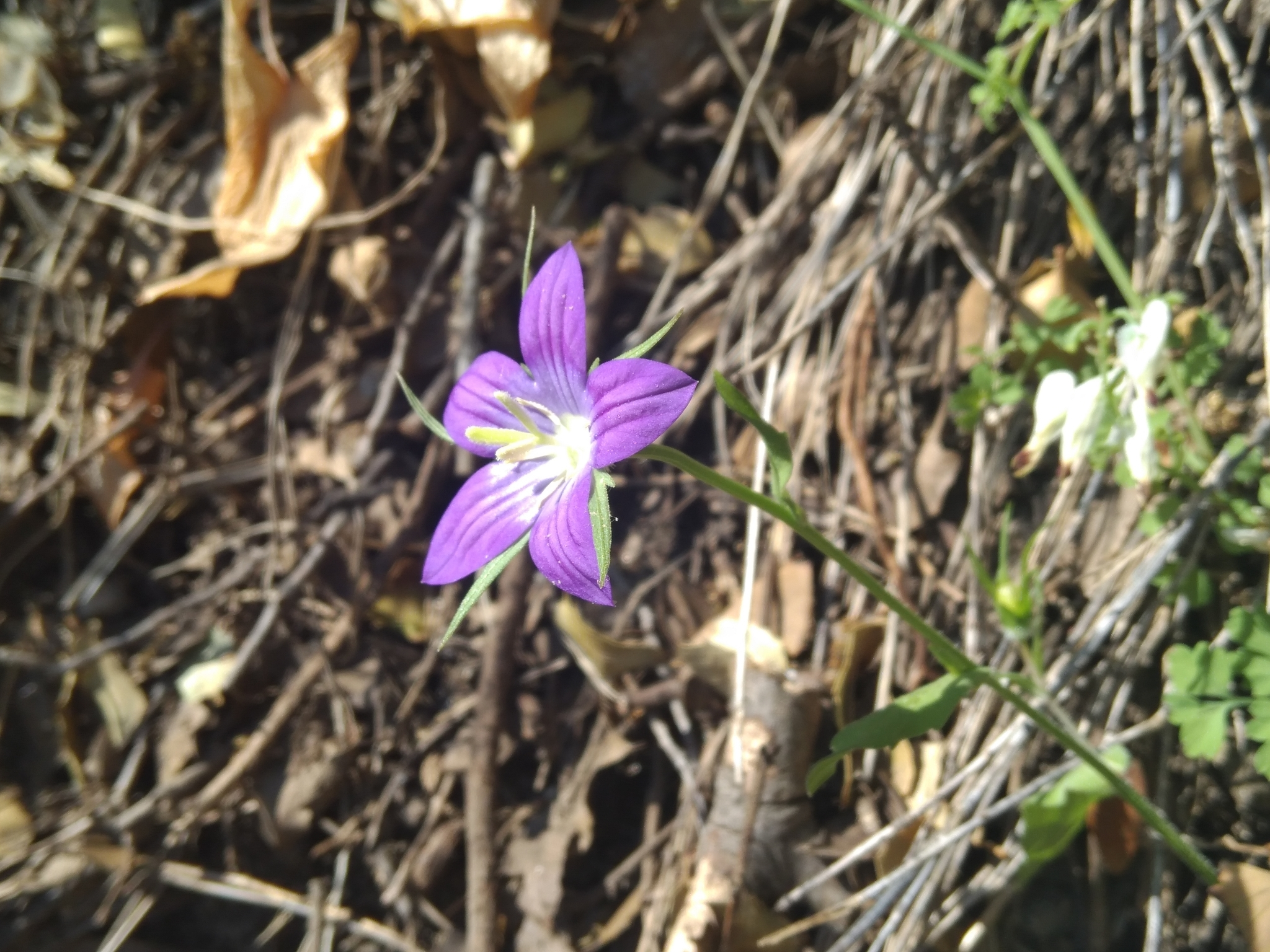
- Flower, stem, and leaves

Scientific classification
- Kingdom: Plantae
- Clade: Tracheophytes
- Clade: Angiosperms
- Clade: Eudicots
- Clade: Asterids
- Order: Asterales
- Family: Campanulaceae
- Genus: Campanula
- Species: C. ramosissima

Binomial name
- Campanula ramosissima Sm.

Synonyms
- Campanula baldensis Balb.; Campanula lorei Pollini; Campanula ramosissima var. glabrescens Hausskn.; Campanula spathulifolia Spruner ex Nyman; Loreia baldensis Raf.

= Campanula ramosissima =

Species of plant

Campanula ramosissima is a species of flowering plant in the bellfower family Campanulaceae, native to Italy, the former Yugoslavia, Albania, and Greece, and introduced to Ireland and Great Britain. There appears to be a cultivar, 'Meteora'.
