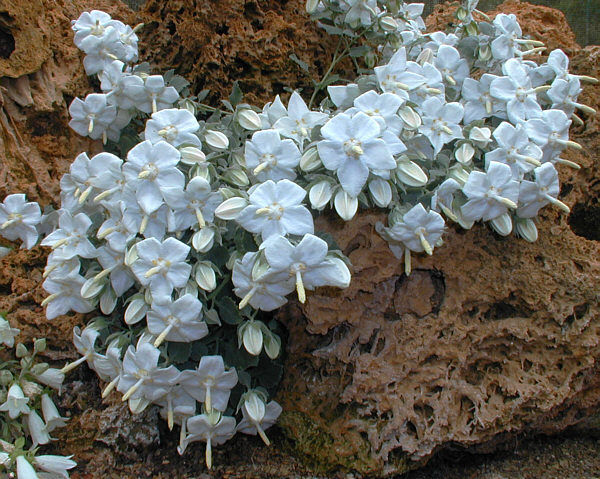

Conservation status
- Critically Endangered (IUCN 3.1)

Scientific classification
- Kingdom: Plantae
- Clade: Embryophytes
- Clade: Tracheophytes
- Clade: Spermatophytes
- Clade: Angiosperms
- Clade: Eudicots
- Clade: Asterids
- Order: Asterales
- Family: Campanulaceae
- Genus: Campanula
- Species: C. troegerae

Binomial name
- Campanula troegerae Damboldt

= Campanula troegerae =

Species of flowering plant

Campanula troegerae is a species of flowering plant in the bellflower family Campanulaceae. It is native to north-eastern Turkey. It can be found in the provinces of Artvin and Erzurum.

== Distribution ==
This species is found on rocky mountainous areas at elevations between 350 and 830 m (1,150 and 2,720 ft).

== Status ==
It is listed as critically endangered by the IUCN. Habitat destruction from agriculture poses a major threat to the species.
