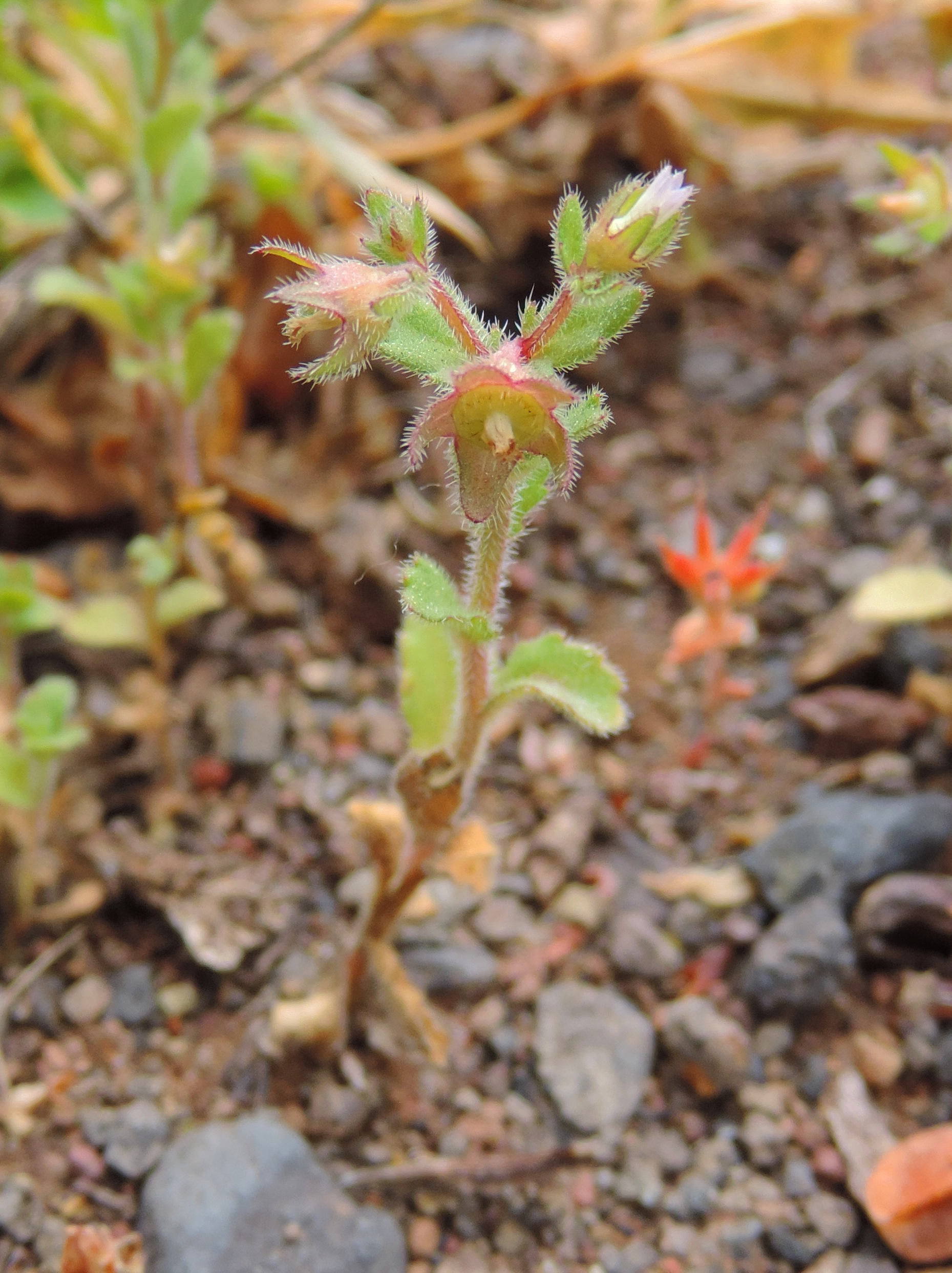

Scientific classification
- Kingdom: Plantae
- Clade: Tracheophytes
- Clade: Angiosperms
- Clade: Eudicots
- Clade: Asterids
- Order: Asterales
- Family: Campanulaceae
- Genus: Campanula
- Species: C. erinus

Binomial name
- Campanula erinus L.

= Campanula erinus =

Species of plant

Campanula erinus is a species of annual herb in the genus Campanula (bellflowers). They have a self-supporting growth form. Individuals can grow to 11 cm tall.

== Sources ==
This article incorporates text from a free content work. Licensed under CC0 (license statement/permission). Text taken from Campanula erinus. Encyclopedia of Life.
