= Campanula seraglio =

Conservation status
- Critically Endangered (IUCN 3.1)

Scientific classification
- Kingdom: Plantae
- Clade: Embryophytes
- Clade: Tracheophytes
- Clade: Spermatophytes
- Clade: Angiosperms
- Clade: Eudicots
- Clade: Asterids
- Order: Asterales
- Family: Campanulaceae
- Genus: Campanula
- Species: C. seraglio

Binomial name
- Campanula seraglio Kit Tan & Sorger

Species of plant

Campanula seraglio, known as the Serail bellflower, is a species of flowering plant in the family Campanulaceae. It is native to northeastern Turkey.

== Distribution ==
This species is found on rocky mountainous crevices at elevations of 1,600m.

== Status ==
It is listed as critically endangered by the IUCN. Human disturbance from eco-tourism poses a threat to the species. This species is situated in a national park.
