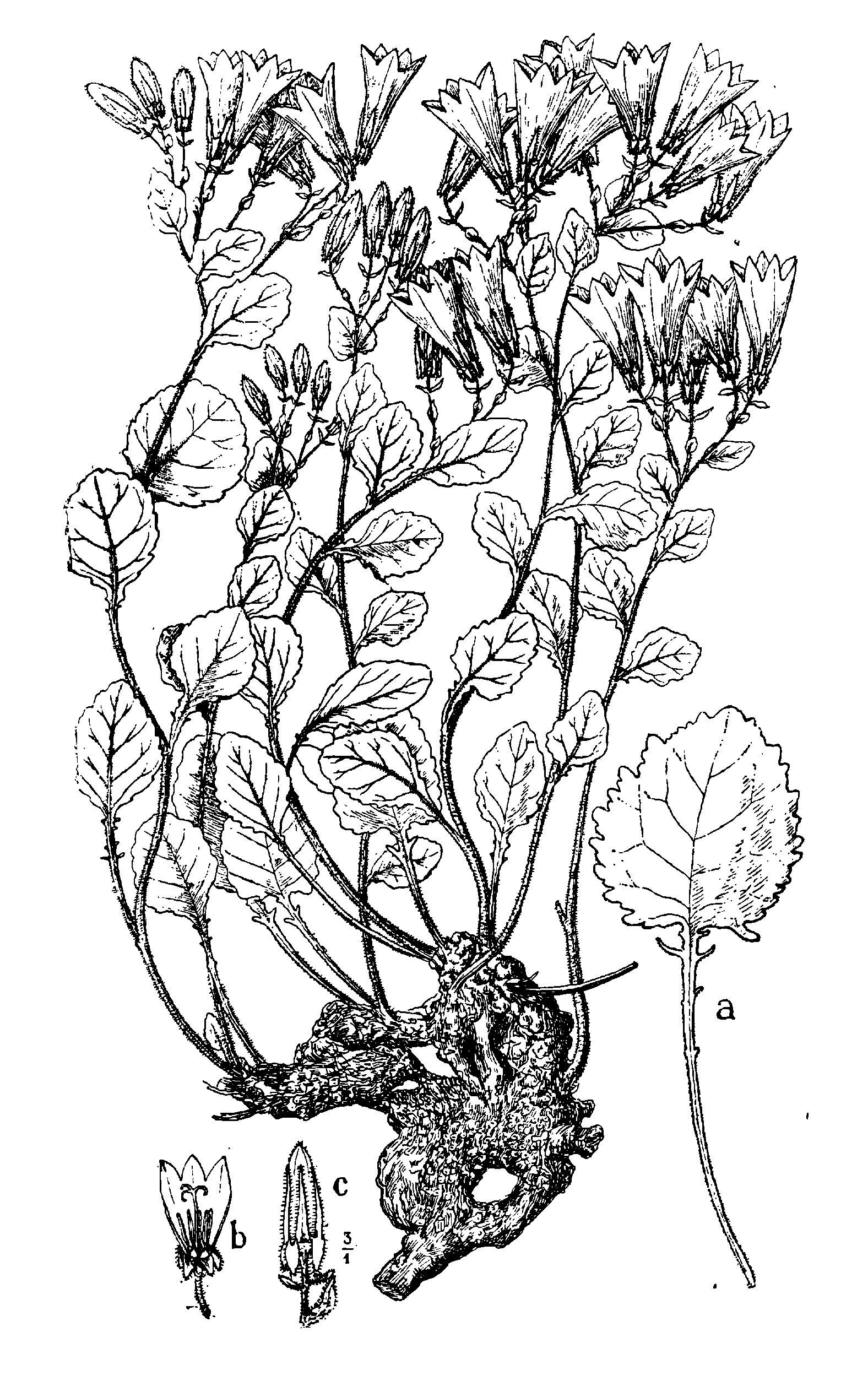
- Campanula kantschavelii

Conservation status
- Critically Endangered (IUCN 3.1)

Scientific classification
- Kingdom: Plantae
- Clade: Tracheophytes
- Clade: Angiosperms
- Clade: Eudicots
- Clade: Asterids
- Order: Asterales
- Family: Campanulaceae
- Genus: Campanula
- Species: C. kantschavelii

Binomial name
- Campanula kantschavelii Zagar.

= Campanula kantschavelii =

Species of flowering plant

Campanula kantschavelii, also known as Kanchaveli's bellflower, is a species of flowering plant in the family Campanulaceae. It is native to Georgia.

== Distribution ==
This species is very rare. It is found in the town of Kvareli, Kakheti, Georgia at the basin of the river Alazani. Its area of occupancy is less than 10 km^{2} and is found on elevations between 800 and 1100m.

== Status ==
It is listed as critically endangered by the IUCN.

=== Threats ===
Deforestation for road creation and wood harvesting has created stresses on the ecosystem which has led to habitat degradation. This, in turn has led to the decline in the species' population.

== Cultivation ==
This species can be propagated with cuttings. They prefer direct sunlight although they can tolerate partial shade.
