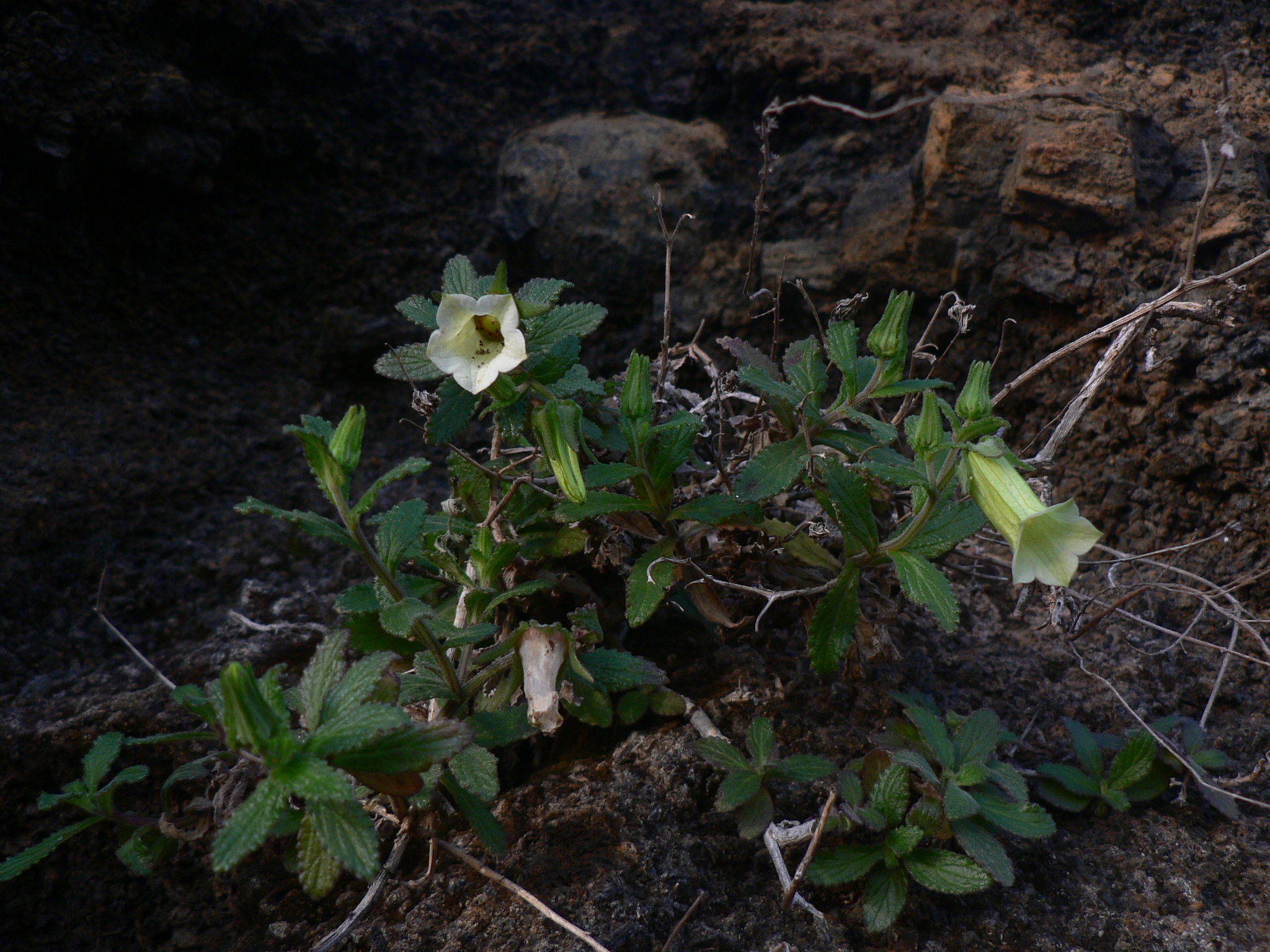

Conservation status
- Endangered (IUCN 3.1)

Scientific classification
- Kingdom: Plantae
- Clade: Embryophytes
- Clade: Tracheophytes
- Clade: Angiosperms
- Clade: Eudicots
- Clade: Asterids
- Order: Asterales
- Family: Campanulaceae
- Genus: Campanula
- Species: C. bravensis

Binomial name
- Campanula bravensis (Bolle) A.Chev, 1935

= Campanula bravensis =

Species of flowering plant in the bellflower family

Campanula bravensis is a species of flowering plant in the bellflower family Campanulaceae. The species is endemic to Cape Verde. The specific name bravensis refers to the island of Brava. The species was described by Carl August Bolle, and named by Auguste Chevalier in 1935. Its local name is contra-bruxas-branca ("white against witches").

== Distribution and ecology ==
Campanula jacobaea occurs in the islands of Santiago, Fogo and Brava.
