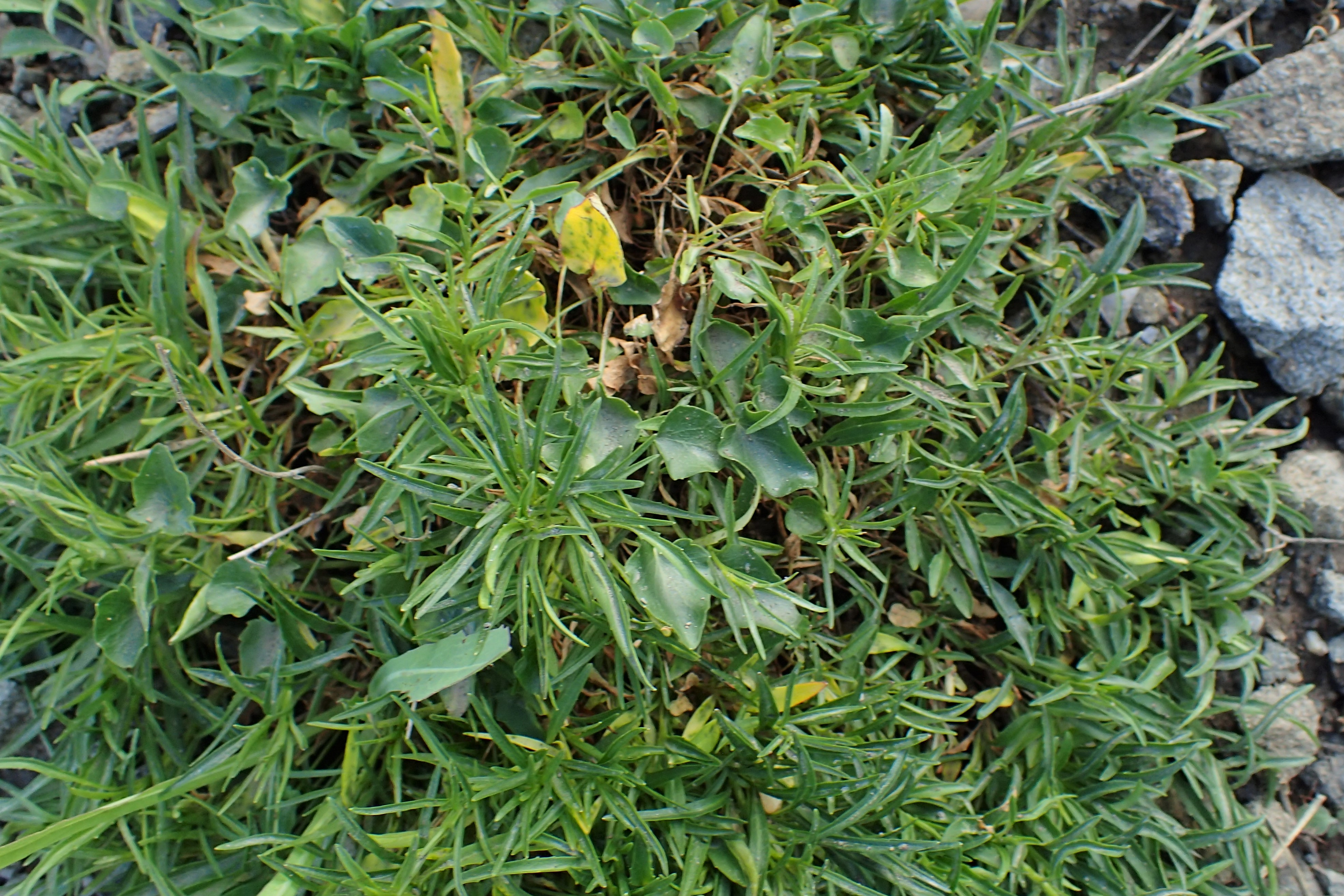

Scientific classification
- Kingdom: Plantae
- Clade: Tracheophytes
- Clade: Angiosperms
- Clade: Eudicots
- Clade: Asterids
- Order: Asterales
- Family: Campanulaceae
- Genus: Campanula
- Species: C. tatrae

Binomial name
- Campanula tatrae Borbás

= Campanula tatrae =

Species of flowering plant

Campanula tatrae is a species of flowering plant native to Ukraine, Romania, Czechoslovakia, and Poland.
