= Campanula monodiana =

Scientific classification
- Kingdom: Plantae
- Clade: Tracheophytes
- Clade: Angiosperms
- Clade: Eudicots
- Clade: Asterids
- Order: Asterales
- Family: Campanulaceae
- Genus: Campanula
- Species: C. monodiana

Binomial name
- Campanula monodiana Maire

Species of flowering plant

Campanula monodiana is a flower native to the Tibesti region of Chad that grows in dry shrublands. It is part of the genus Campanula which is native to Africa, Western Asia, and the Mediterranean.
