= Campanula akhdarensis =

Scientific classification
- Kingdom: Plantae
- Clade: Tracheophytes
- Clade: Angiosperms
- Clade: Eudicots
- Clade: Asterids
- Order: Asterales
- Family: Campanulaceae
- Genus: Campanula
- Species: C. akhdarensis

Binomial name
- Campanula akhdarensis A.G.Mill. & Whitc.

Species of flowering plant

Campanula akhdarensis is a flowering plant in the Campanula genus and Campanulaceae family. A subshrub, it grows in Northern Oman. It was photographed on the terrace walls and gardens on Jabal Akhdar in Oman.
