= Campanula lazica =

Conservation status
- Critically Endangered (IUCN 3.1)

Scientific classification
- Kingdom: Plantae
- Clade: Embryophytes
- Clade: Tracheophytes
- Clade: Angiosperms
- Clade: Eudicots
- Clade: Asterids
- Order: Asterales
- Family: Campanulaceae
- Genus: Campanula
- Species: C. lazica

Binomial name
- Campanula lazica (Boiss. & Balansa) Kharadze

Synonyms
- Symphyandra lazica Boiss. & Balansa

Species of flowering plant

Campanula lazica is a species of flowering plant in the bellflower family, Campanulaceae. It is endemic to northeast Anatolia, Turkey.

== Description ==
This species can be found in rocky areas at elevations between 1,200–1,800 m (3,900–5,900 ft). It is estimated to occupy an area of 9 km^{2} (3.5 sq mi).

== Conservation ==
It is listed as critically endangered by the IUCN. Human disturbance, soil erosion and livestock grazing all pose a serious threat to the Campanula lazica. Its habitat lies within a national park.
