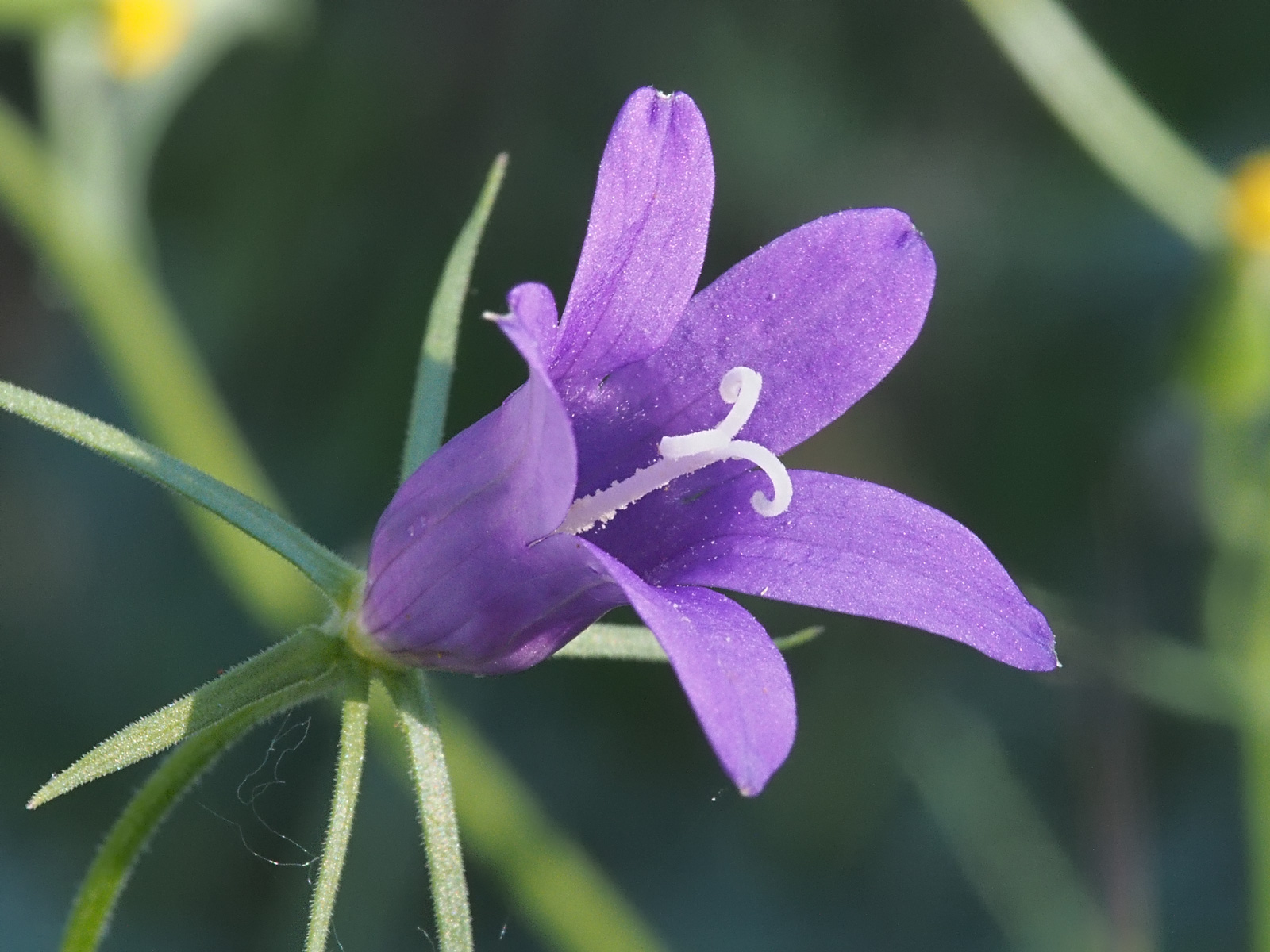
- Close-up of flower
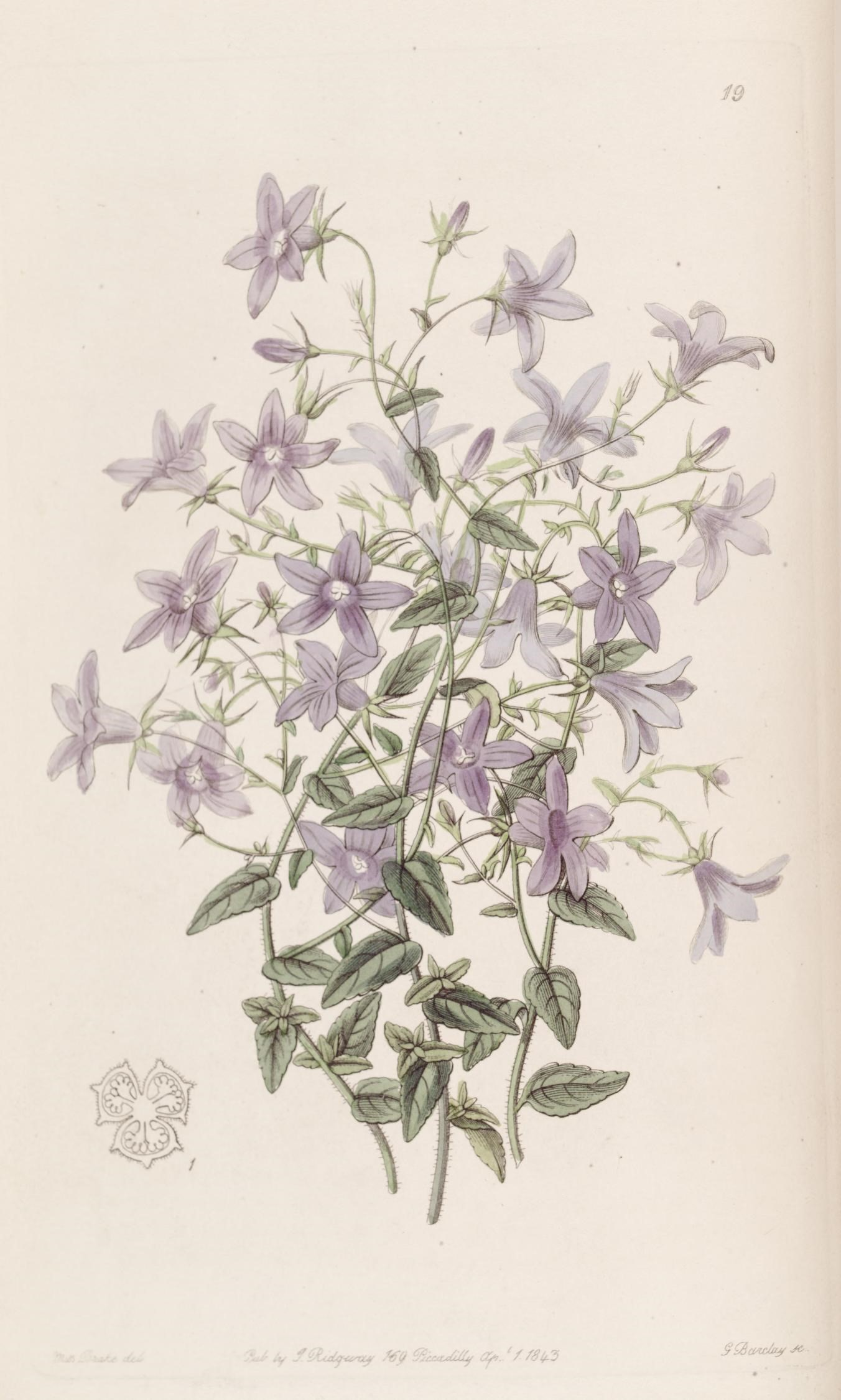
- Botanical illustration

Scientific classification
- Kingdom: Plantae
- Clade: Tracheophytes
- Clade: Angiosperms
- Clade: Eudicots
- Clade: Asterids
- Order: Asterales
- Family: Campanulaceae
- Genus: Campanula
- Species: C. lusitanica

Binomial name
- Campanula lusitanica Loefl.

Synonyms
- List: Campanula durieui Boiss.; Campanula erinoides Cav.; Campanula erinoides L.; Campanula loeflingii Brot.; Campanula loeflingii var. durieui (Boiss.) Nyman; Campanula loeflingii var. occidentalis Lange; Campanula longipes Coss. ex Nyman; Campanula loreyi A.Blanco ex Nyman; Campanula lusitanica var. maura Murb.; Campanula lusitanica f. occidentalis (Lange) Cout.; Campanula lusitanica var. pseudophrygia Lacaita; Campanula lusitanica var. puberula C.Vicioso; Campanula lusitanica f. stricta Merino; Campanula patula var. lusitanica (Loefl.) Pau; Campanula ramosissima Willd. ex Steud.

= Campanula lusitanica =

Species of plant

Campanula lusitanica, the Lusitanian bellflower, is a species of flowering plant in the family Campanulaceae, native to Portugal and Spain. It is the namesake of a species complex.

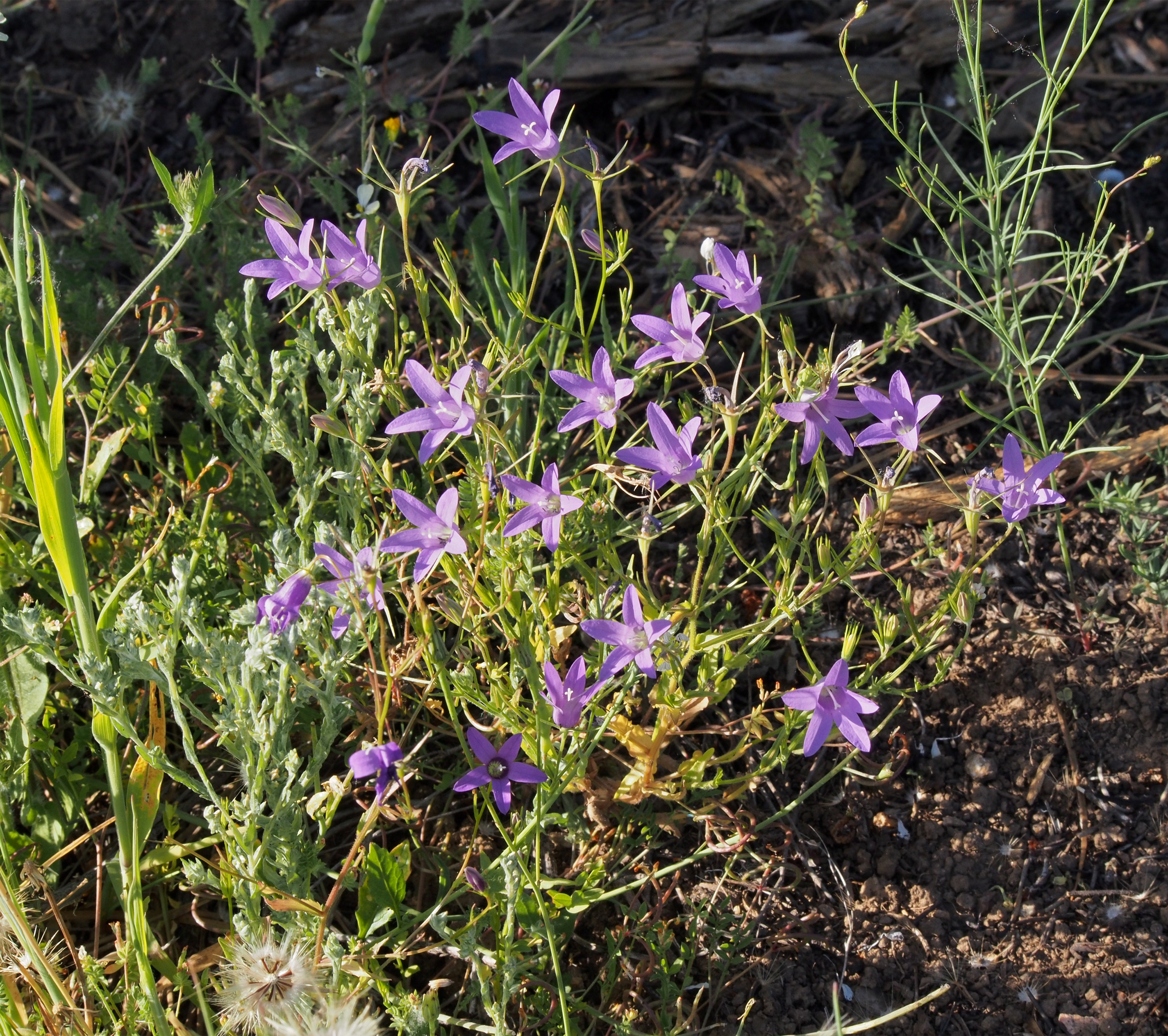
Habit
