= Flora of the Massif Central =

Plants found in region of France

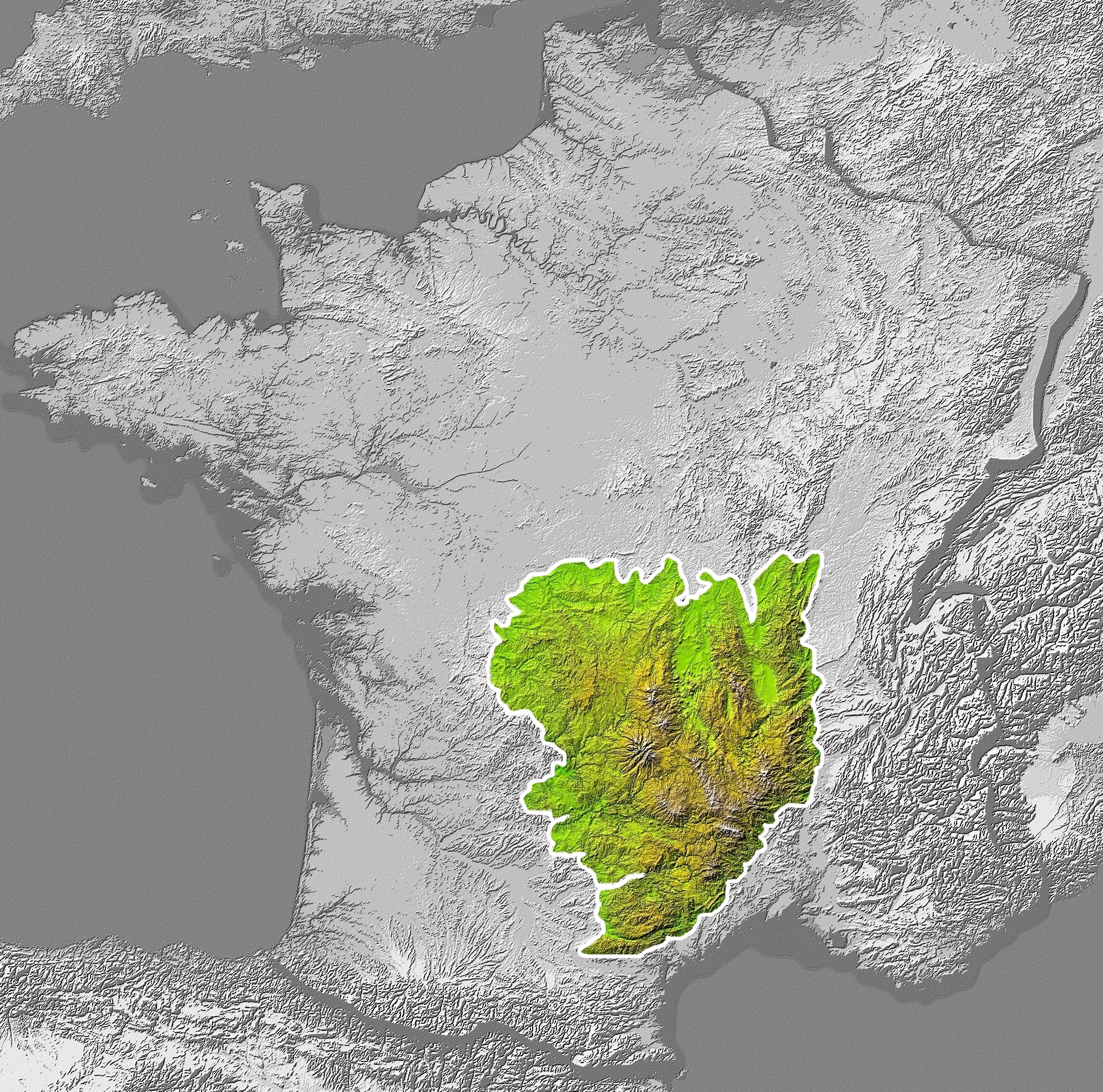
The Massif Central is located in the center-south of France, at the crossroads of several climatic zones: oceanic to the west, continental to the east, and Mediterranean to the south.

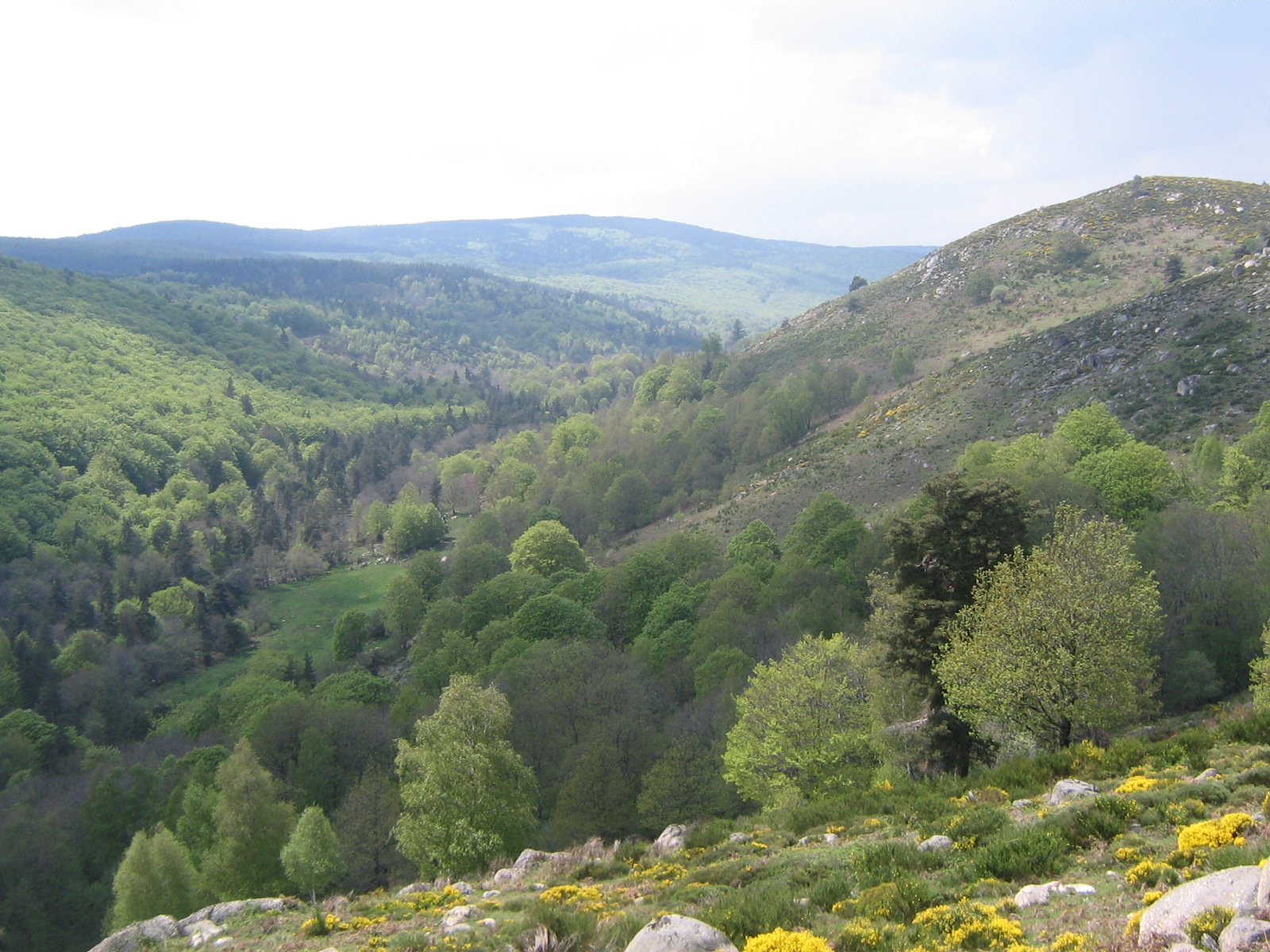
Contrasting vegetation between an adret, occupied by a heath of purgative broom, and a ubac, covered by a beech forest, in a valley in the Massif Central (Biourière valley in Aubrac)

The flora (Note: Only vascular plants are covered here, with the exception of ferns. Non-vascular plants (bryophytes), a difficult group reserved for specialists, will not be discussed, nor will lichens and fungi. A chorological and phytosociological point of view has been favored to make the article more pleasant to read.) of the Massif Central is rich and diverse. This diversity can be explained by the massif's large surface area, its position at the intersection of different climatic zones, and its geological variety. The plants that can be found in the very wet western part are not the same as those found in the drier eastern part, and the difference is even greater in the species that can be found in the southern part (Causses, Cévennes), which are subject to marked Mediterranean influences. This spatial component is not the only aspect involved, since exposure, altitude, and the nature of the substrate are also determining factors. For example, there is contrast between south-facing (adret) and north-facing (ubec) slopes, and a difference in vegetation between acidic soils (granite) and basic soils (limestone or basalt). Although the altitude of the Massif Central is low compared to other mountain ranges such as the Alps or the Pyrenees, there is a clear range of vegetation, from Mediterranean vegetation to sub-alpine grassland (as is seen in the Cévennes). Generally speaking, in most of the Massif Central, there are four distinct levels of vegetation.

- a lowland level up to 500 m altitude, well represented in Limagne
- a hill level, up to 900 m altitude in most of the massif, except in the north-west where this limit is lower
- a mountainous zone, up to 1,500 m altitude
- a subalpine zone, above 1,500 m altitude

In the Cévennes, the plain level can be described as the "Mediterranean level". These limits can vary according to exposure - for example, they are lower on north-facing slopes.

== Lowland ==
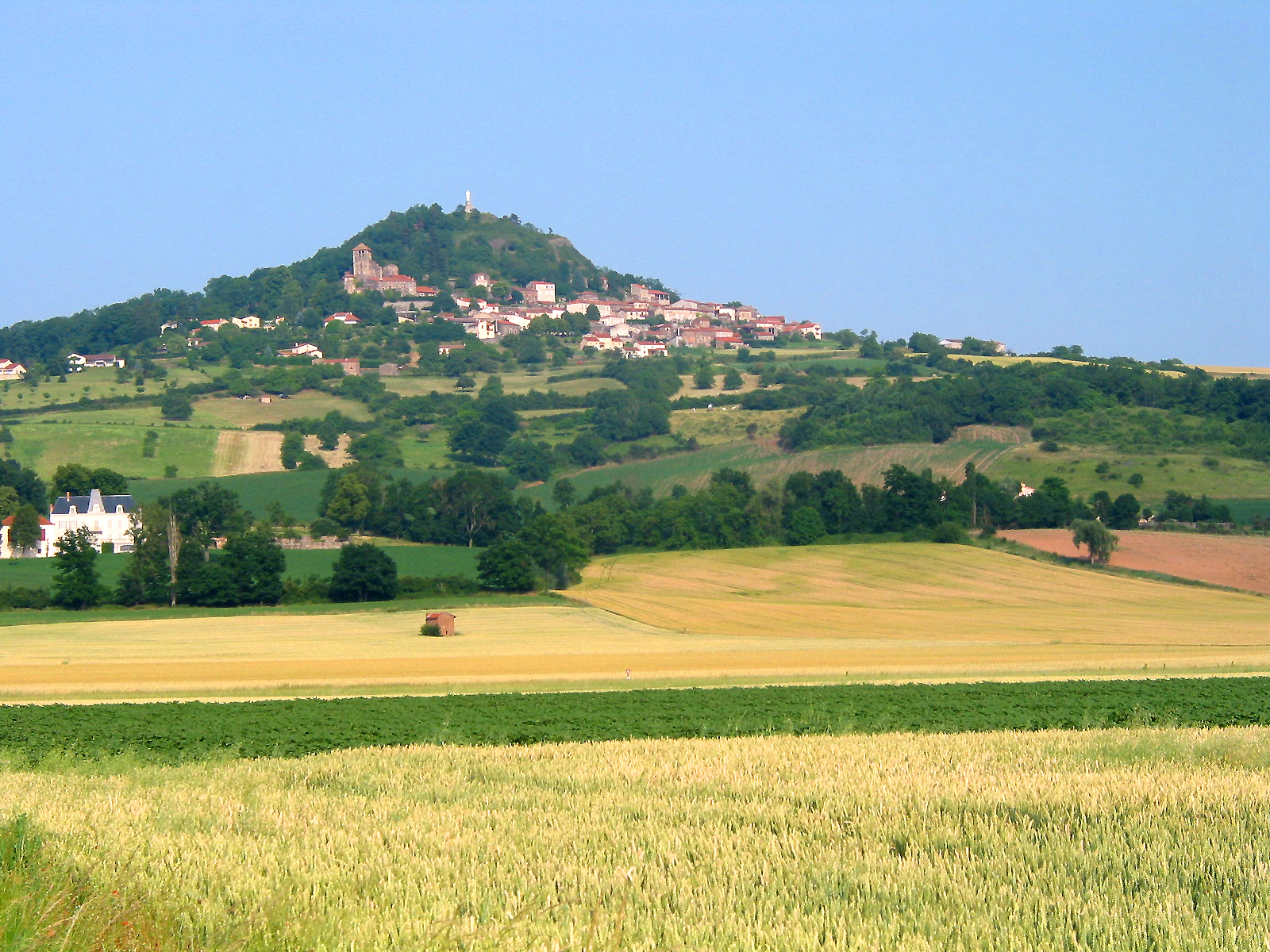
The Limagne plain with its small volcanic peaks

Lowlands are relatively rare in the Massif Central, given its high plateaux, but are present on the Limagne Plain and in the Roanne and Montbrison basins. These are intensively farmed areas that include little natural vegetation. They also receive little water (the Limagne d'Issoire is one of the driest areas in France, with just over 500 mm of rainfall a year) and are subject to a fairly marked semi-continental climate (more accurately, a semi-oceanic "intramontane" or semi-oceanic shelter climate in France), with hot summers and cold winters, due to frequent temperature inversions. Characteristic plants of this environment include downy oak (Quercus pubescens), Etruscan honeysuckle (Lonicera etrusca), sainfoin (Onobrychis viciifolia), meadow sage (Salvia pratensis), red poppy, red clover, wild pansy, common milkwort (Polygala vulgaris), yarrow, Persian speedwell and many others that are not specific to the flora of Auvergne.

The few small volcanic peaks that are scattered across Limagne are of ecological interest in that Mediterranean flora thrives on their southern slopes, where plants of clearly southern origin include Montpellier burclover (Medicago monspeliaca), morning glory (Convolvulus lineatus) and Montpellier astragalus (Astragalus monspessulanus).

In the Cévennes, the plains are covered by Mediterranean shrubland, dominated by holm oak.

== Hills ==
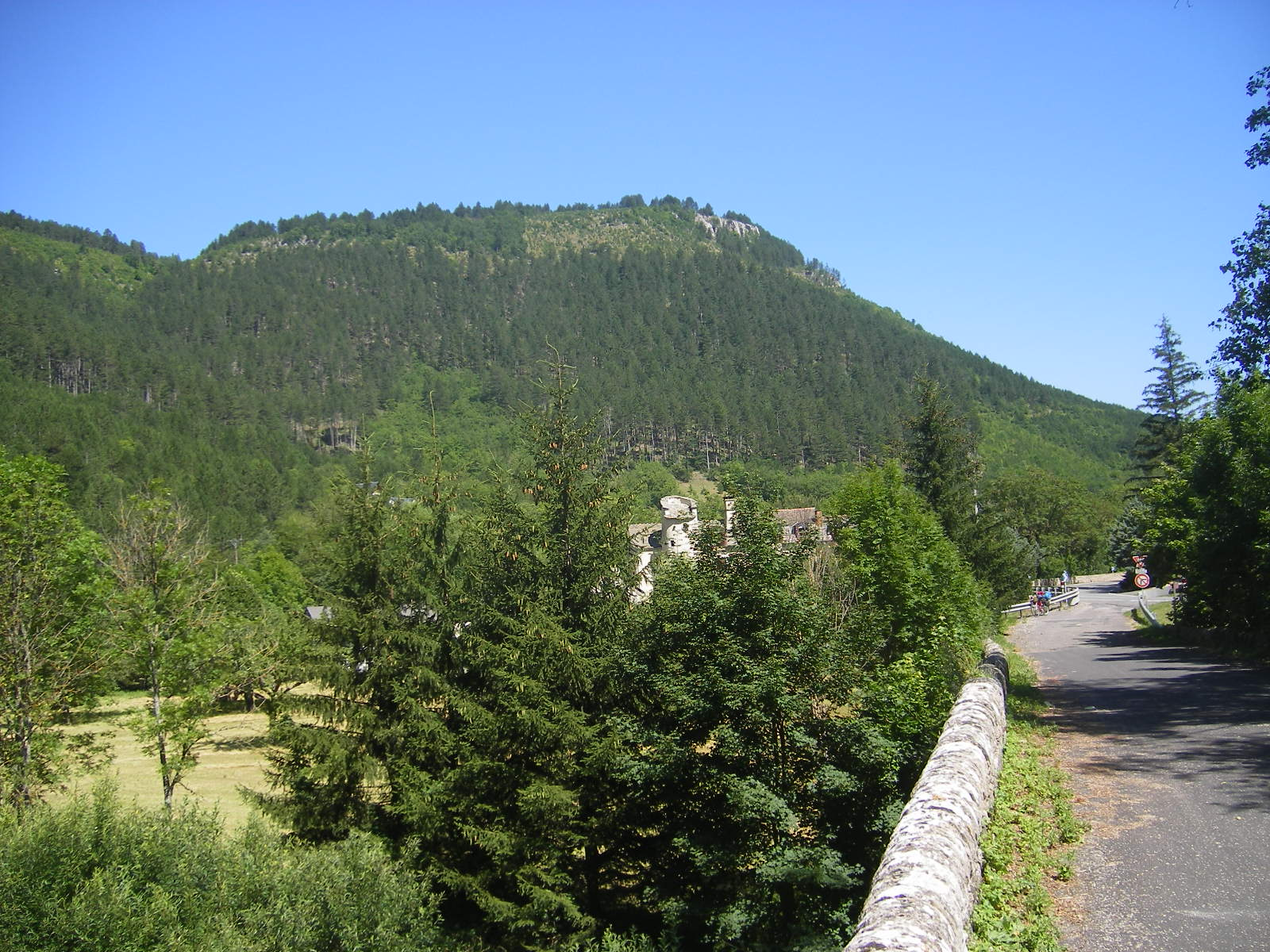
The Lot valley towards Mende. The slopes have been heavily planted with black pine.

This level is more often forested than the lower level. The characteristic trees at this altitude are the Sessile Oak and the Pedunculate Oak, especially in the west of the massif. In the east, the Scots pine can be found. Classic woodland flowers such as Lily of the Valley, Wood Anemone, common cow-wheat and Solomon's Seal can be found here. Slightly less common plants include the Stinking hellebore or Bear's foot, a plant that is easy to recognize and characteristic of basic soils (especially limestone). In the nineteenth and twentieth centuries, this level was the subject of massive reforestation, primarily in the Limousin region where conifers were planted, but also in the south on certain steep slopes which tended to erode, such as the black pine forests all around the causses and in particular in the upper Lot valley around Mende.

There are some areas of ecological interest, such as the Planèze of Saint-Flour, where relatively rare flowers of continental origin (Veronica spicata) and Atlantic origin (Ranunculus nodiflorus) can be found in the same place. Similarly, in the Puy-en-Velay basin, it is possible to find segetal species (those linked to cereal fields) of oriental origin, such as Conringia orientalis and Neslia apiculata. The Grands Causses region also has a flora of great interest, due to its particular geology and location, which is characterized by a strong spread of Mediterranean flora as well as the presence of plants from steppe and limestone mountain environments (see below).

Also of note is the presence of a carnation endemic to the Massif Central: the granite carnation (Dianthus graniticus) which, as its name suggests, grows on siliceous soil in the Cévennes and Vivarais up to an altitude of around 1,000 m (3,300 ft).

== Mountains ==
=== Forest ===
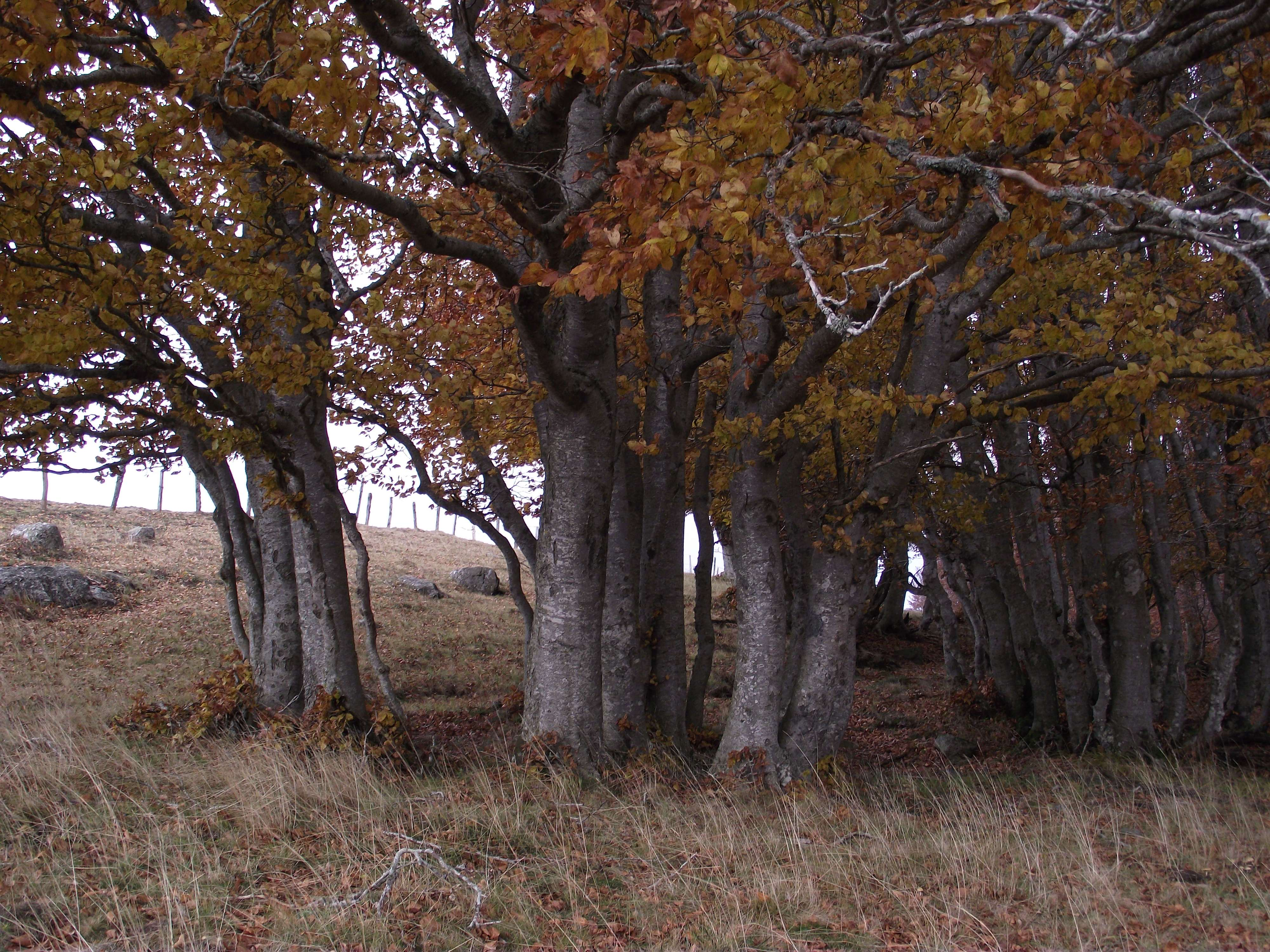
High altitude beech forest in autumn. Trees are limited to 5–6 m (16–20 ft) in height due to the strength of the winds.

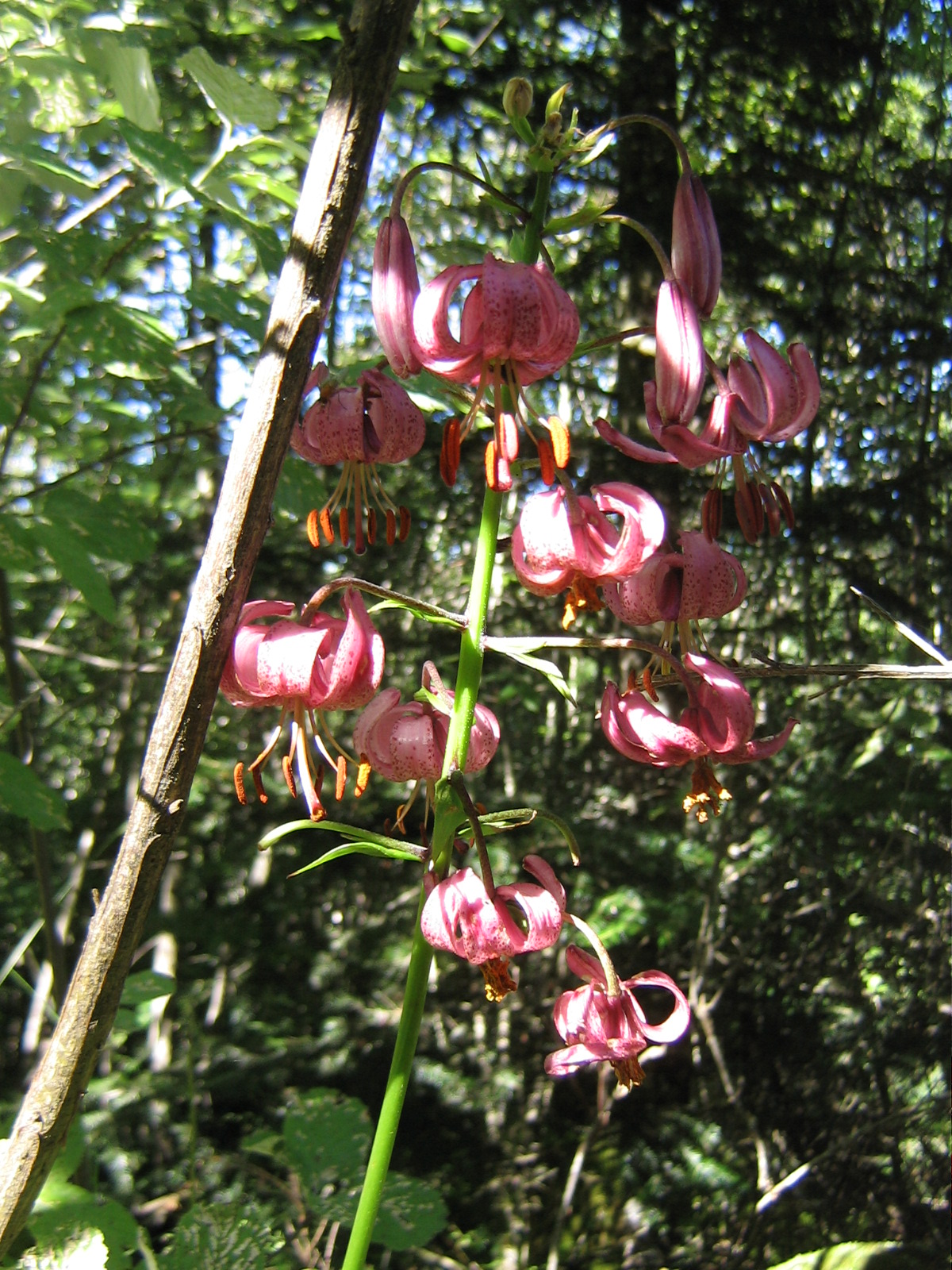
Martagon lily (Aubrac mountains)

At 900 m (3,000 ft), the beech forest begins, with its highly characteristic flora. Beech dominates at this altitude, being a large part of the western half of the massif. In the east, particularly in the Haute-Loire, beech is replaced by Scots pine, due to the drier climate. In some cold, damp areas, fir is mixed in with beech and may even become dominant, such as in the Monts du Cantal, Artense, northern Margeride, Forez mountains. It is at the mountain level that the Massif Central begins to stand out from the lowlands that surround it for the great richness of its flora. The species found vary depending on whether the woodlands have a basaltic subsoil (basic rock) or a granitic subsoil (acid rock). In the former locations, there are calcicole flowers, such as the very precocious Snowdrop, Montane knapweed, February daphne, yellow thistle, Five- or Seven-leaved Cardamine and Cacaliaster Groundsel. Sometimes, paradoxically, there are calcifugous species, due to the relatively neutral nature of basalt, which contains little silica or calcium carbonate in a natural state, these elements being in the form of silicates. On granite, on the other hand, there are no calcicolous species. Acidophilous species include wood ragwort (very common in Forez), Prenanthes purpurea, common cow-wheat, and small cow-wheat. However, the vast majority of flowers thrive in both types of soil: Sweet woodruff, Martagon lily, two-leaved cornflower, Snow-white wood-rush, common foxglove, Herb Paris, Austrian Doronicum (Doronicum austriacum), Alpine squill, Pyrenean squill (west of the massif), whorled Solomon's seal, and Large-flowered Calament ("Aubrac tea"). Climatic influences also play a part: for example, rare plants with an Atlantic affinity such as the Welsh poppy (Meconopsis cambrica) can be found in the forests of the western part of the massif.

All these plants are found in the Beech zone, especially on the edges of woods or in clearings, as beech woods are very dark, which prevents the majority of plants from growing, or in hazel coppices, but some of them can also be found in the Scots Pine zone. However, since pine forests are lighter, they are home to more plant species, particularly shrubs such as Common Juniper and mosses.

Finally, foxglove and fireweed, pioneer species that sometimes colonize large areas, are very common in woodland cuttings, often accompanied (Note: Phytosociological class Epilobietea angustifolii.) by trees or shrubs such as Birch, Black Elder (altitude < 1,200 m), Red Elder (rare below 1,000 m altitude) or, more commonly, Scotch Broom.

=== Open areas ===
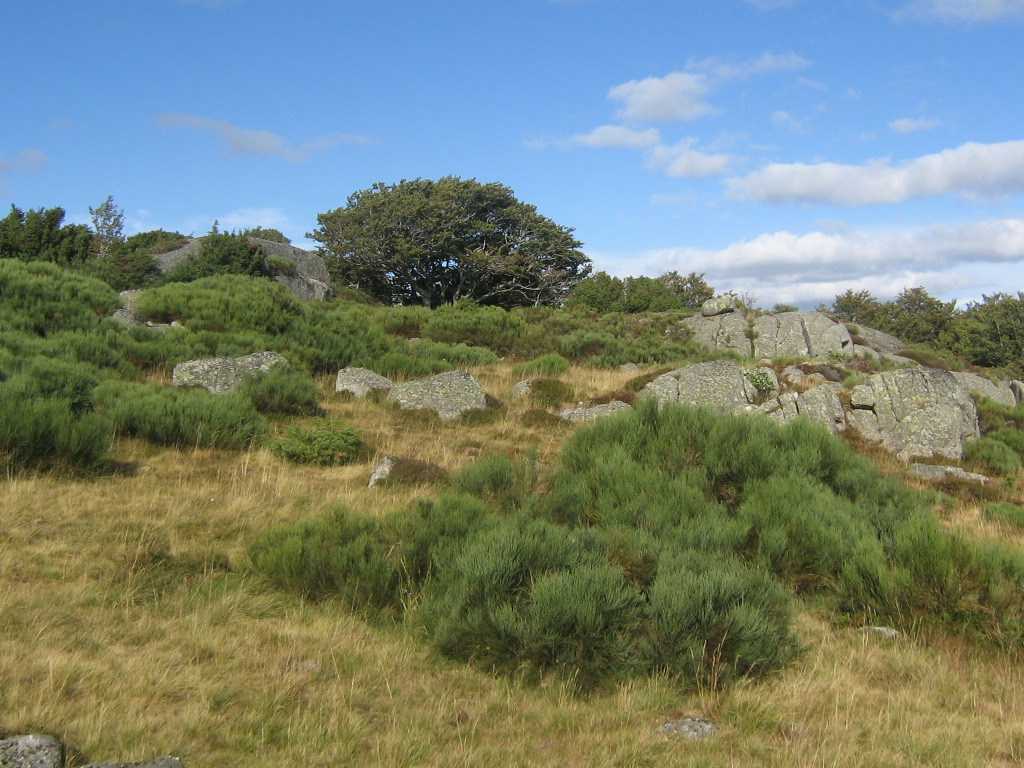
Heaths of Genêt purgative (Aubrac)

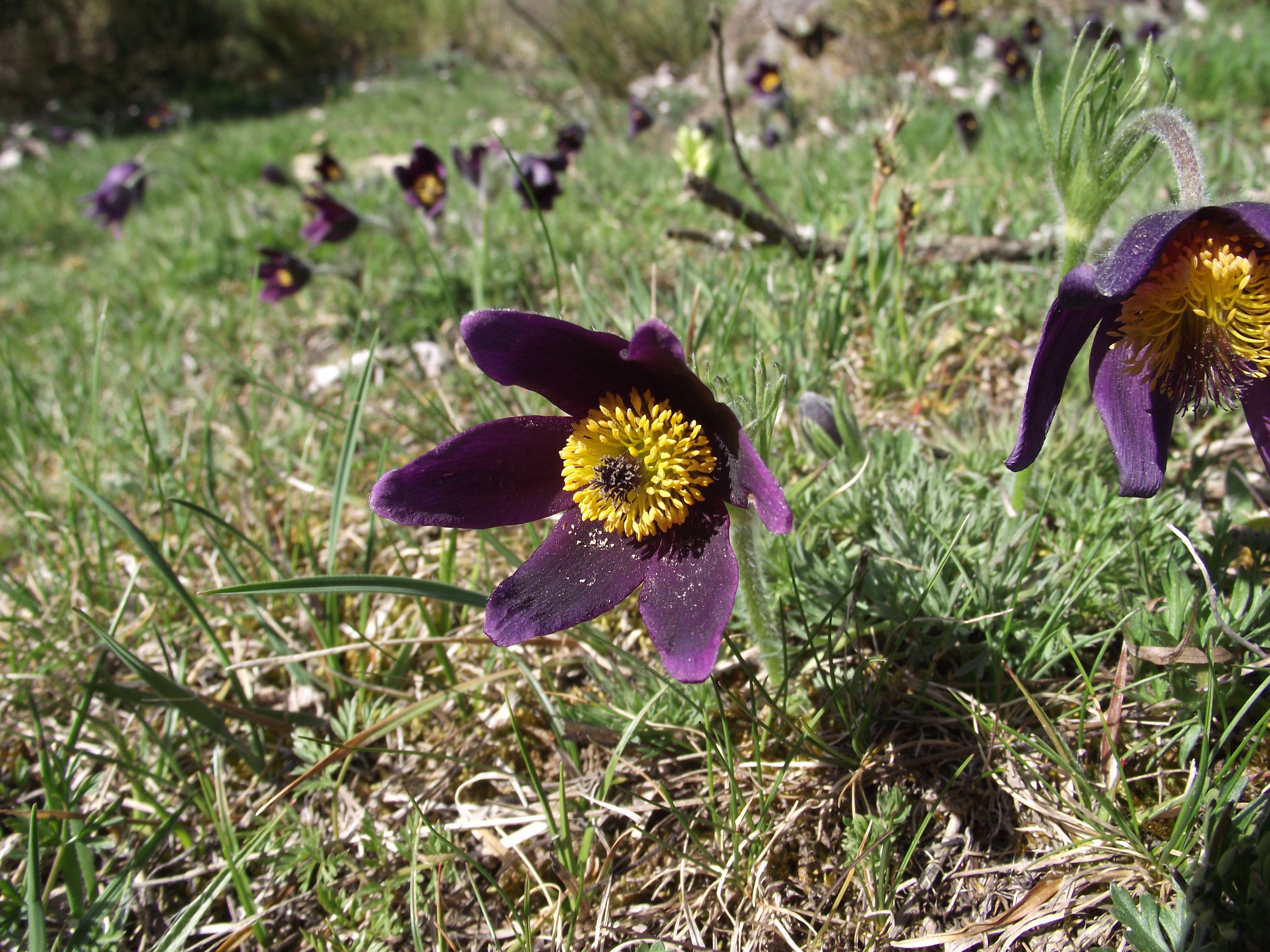
Red Pulsatilla (endemic to the Massif Central)

In the Massif Central, the open spaces of the mountainous regions are all man-made. There are three main types: pastures on volcanic mountains, (Note: Pastures characterized by the Diantho sylvatici-Meum athamantici association (Carnation, Meum), of which phytosociologists distinguish 2 variants: a semi-heliophilous one with Euphorbia hyberna (a relict species of the beech forest) and a more hygrophilous one with Serratula tinctoria. Source: Pelouses acidiclines montagnardes du Massif central archive, Natura 2000) which are very rich both ecologically and agronomically; moors or grasslands on granitic or schistose soils, which are less interesting agronomically but very rich in species; and finally, hay meadows. Within heathland, several sub-categories can be distinguished: heathland with fern, purgative broom, (Note: In the literature, this heath is referred to as " Cytisus purgans mountain formation". It is very common in the south and center of the massif (Margeride, Aubrac, Cévennes). However, on deep soils, purgative broom competes strongly with Scotch broom (Cytisus scoparius), with which it forms mixed heaths. Sources: Landes à Genêt purgatif du Massif central [archive], Natura 2000.) callune or common bilberry (Note: Whortleberry participates in several plant associations, defining several heath subtypes: yellow gentian and whortleberry heath, rock bedstraw and whortleberry heath, whortleberry and hairy broom heath (Forez stubble). Sources: Landes acidiphiles montagnardes du Massif central [archive], Natura 2000.) (the latter two are generally found on thin granite soil). In addition, as moorlands are transitional areas between pasture and forest, they are often home to native tree and shrub species including birch, wild rose, hazel, hawthorn, rowan and whitebeam.

Boundary hedges (where they exist, as bocage landscapes are fairly rare in the Massif Central) also include some interesting woody species such as Common Ash (which is often severely pruned, as its leaves are used to feed livestock), Norway maple, Sycamore maple, blackthorn, raspberry and black birch, a shrub with white flowers that only grows at a certain altitude.

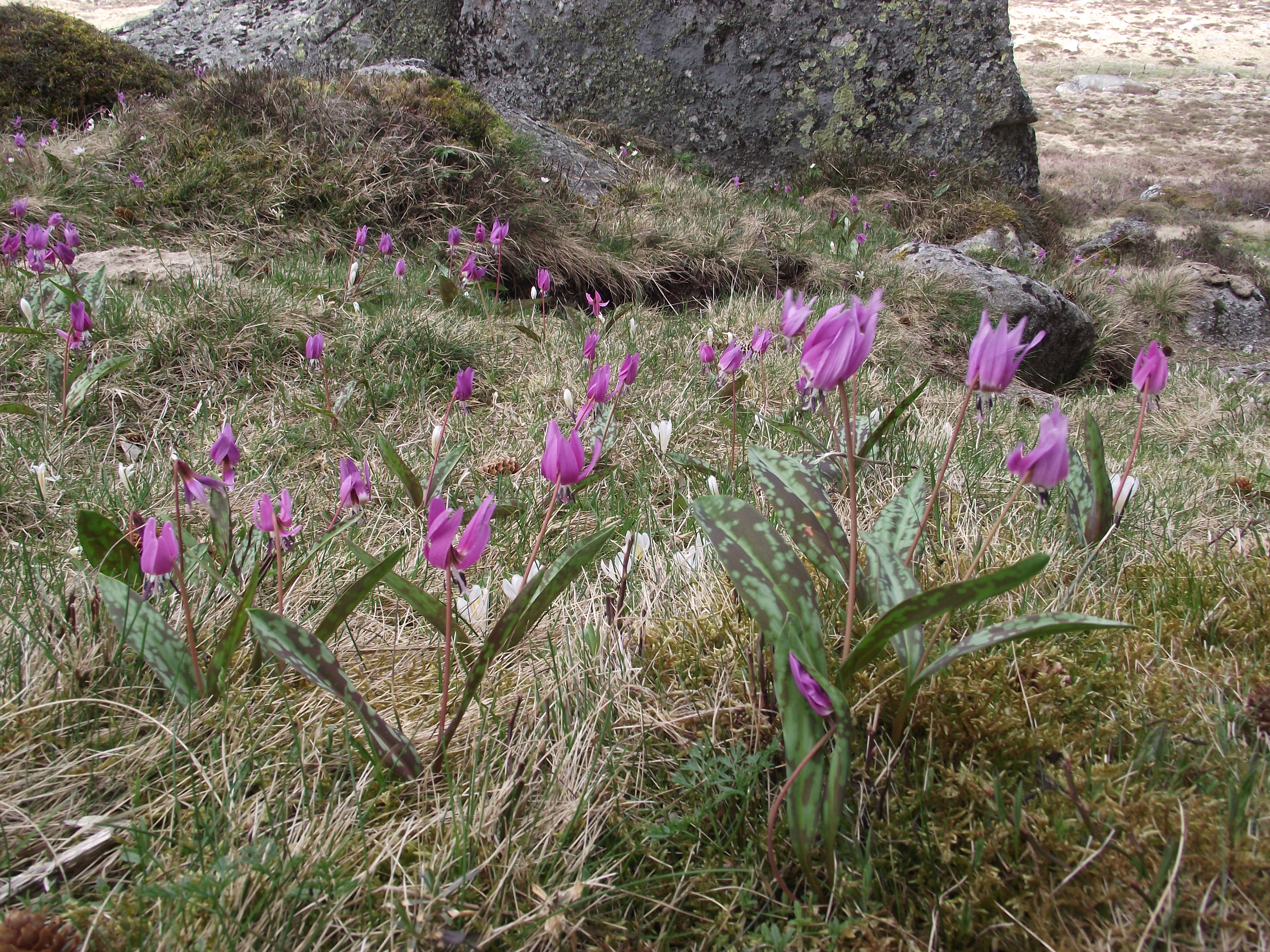
Heath in spring with Crocus and Dogtooth Erythrone

In terms of the herbaceous layer, grasses (Note: Grasses do not have remarkable flowers and are often difficult to identify. For this reason, they are briefly mentioned here, and only the most characteristic species or those with a marked mountain affinity are cited.) make up most of the plant cover, with a large number of species represented. The most common, particularly in acidic grassland and moorland, are orchard grass, tall wheatgrass, red fescue, common bentgrass, and stiff spurge; grassland dominated by stiff spurge is known as narda. There are also a number of species that are more typical of high-altitude pastures or heaths, such as sweet vernal grass, wavy hair-grass (Deschampsia flexuosa), broadleaf bluegrass and field fescue (Festuca arvernensis), the latter being endemic to the Massif Central and found in broom heaths.

As for the other flowering plants, they are distributed to varying degrees in all three types of open spaces. For example, there are species that can grow equally well in all three areas: yellow gentian, dog's tooth (in the western mountains), narcissus, elder-flowered orchid, European white hellebore, and mountain arnica. Others prefer mown meadows, such as Spiked rampion, Bistort, Poet's daffodil. Others are more often found in unmown pastures (whether granite or basalt), such as Petty whin, hairy greenweed, field gentian, Pulsatilla rubra (which is endemic to the Massif Central and found mainly on the eastern slopes of the various massifs), Meum athamanticum (also known as cistre, this plant is grazed by Salers or Aubrac cows and is responsible for the flavor of Cantal cheese), Irish Euphorbia (an Atlantic plant found in the west of the massif), Pyrenean Dandilion, and Conyza-leaved hawksbeard.

Finally, forming a transition between dry meadows and peat bogs, peaty meadows can occupy vast areas, especially on plateaux such as Aubrac or Cézallier. This is the domain of the Tufted hairgrass (Deschampsia cespitosa) and the purple moor-grass (Molinia caerula), plants accompanied by various species of rush (Sharp-flowered rush, Juncus conglomeratus) and a few other characteristic plants such as Sneezewort, Devil's-bit scabious, and red-brown clover.

=== Wetlands ===
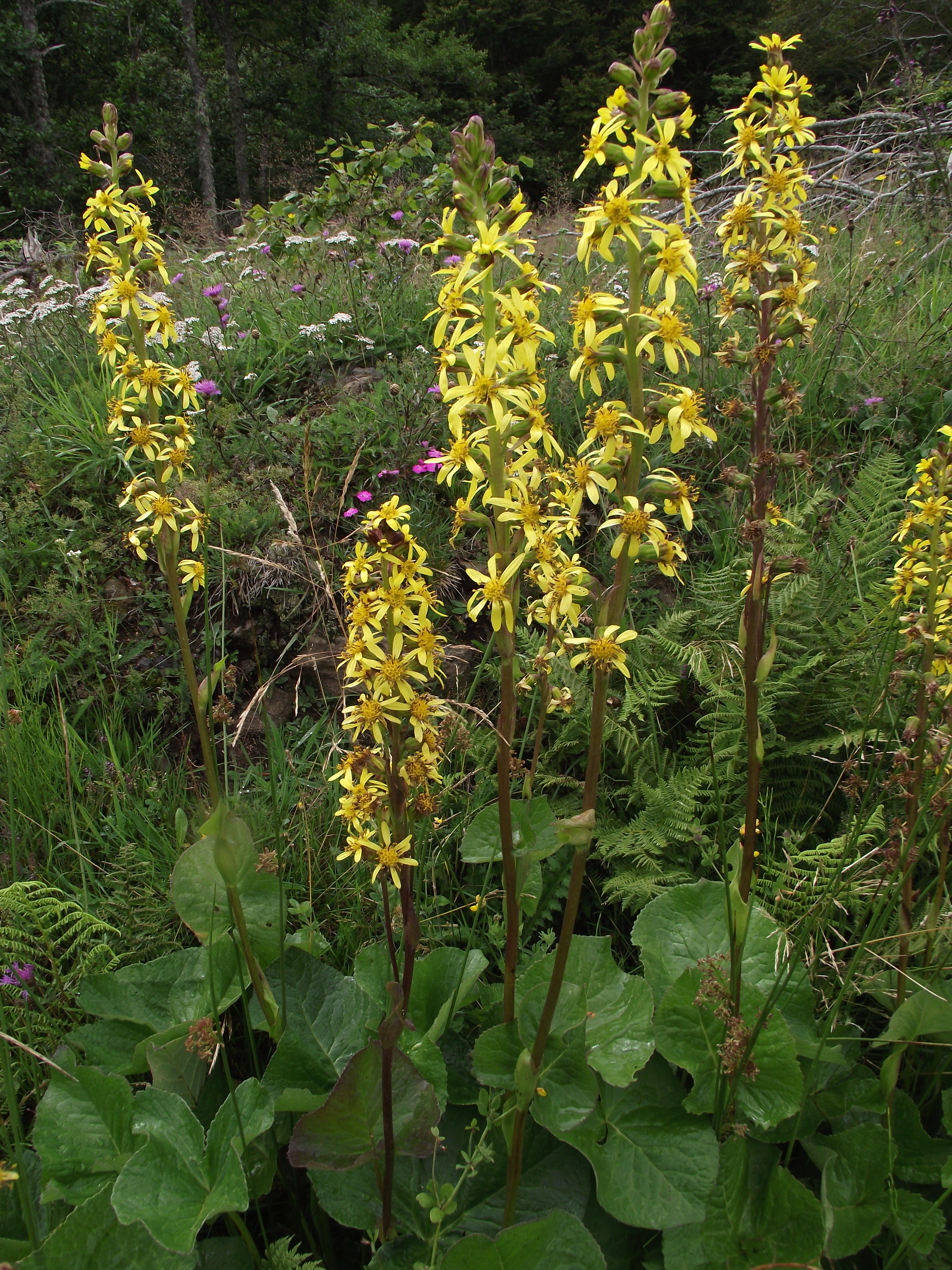
A plant that is extremely rare in France: the Siberian Ligularia

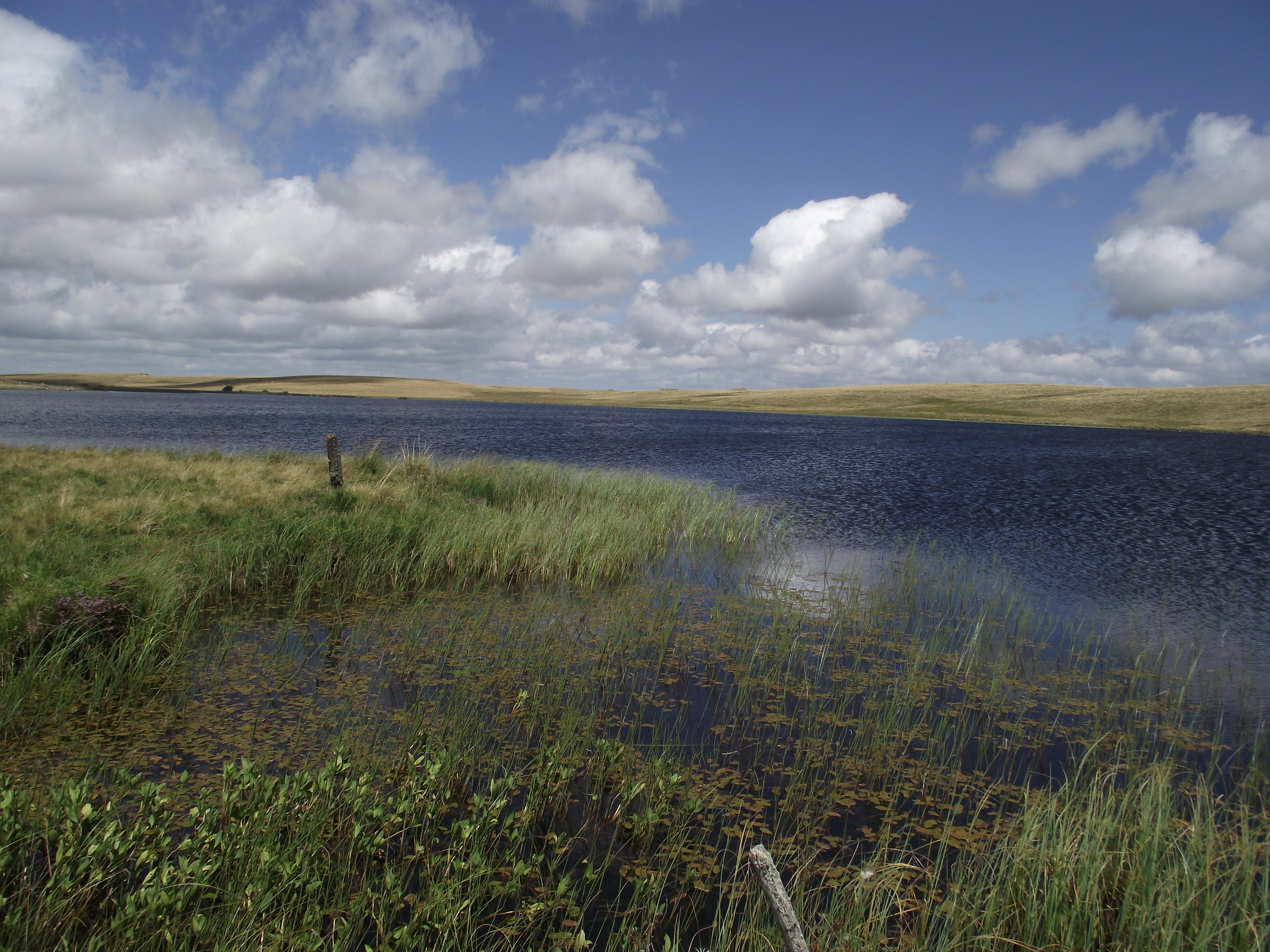
Aquatic plants on the banks of the Saint-Andéol lake (Aubrac). In particular, we can see Water Clover and Swimming Flute (small leaves that float).

Wetlands can include a number of biotopes: riverbanks or lakeshores, megaphorbs and peat bogs. (Note: Most of the peat bogs in the Massif Central, particularly in the northeastern part (Forez, Margeride), are classified as Medio-European active raised bogs, i.e. with a majority of continental or boreal species. In the western part of the massif, the peat bogs contain a greater number of species of Atlantic origin (e.g. Narthécie des marais). Source: Active raised bog vegetation [archive], Natura 2000)

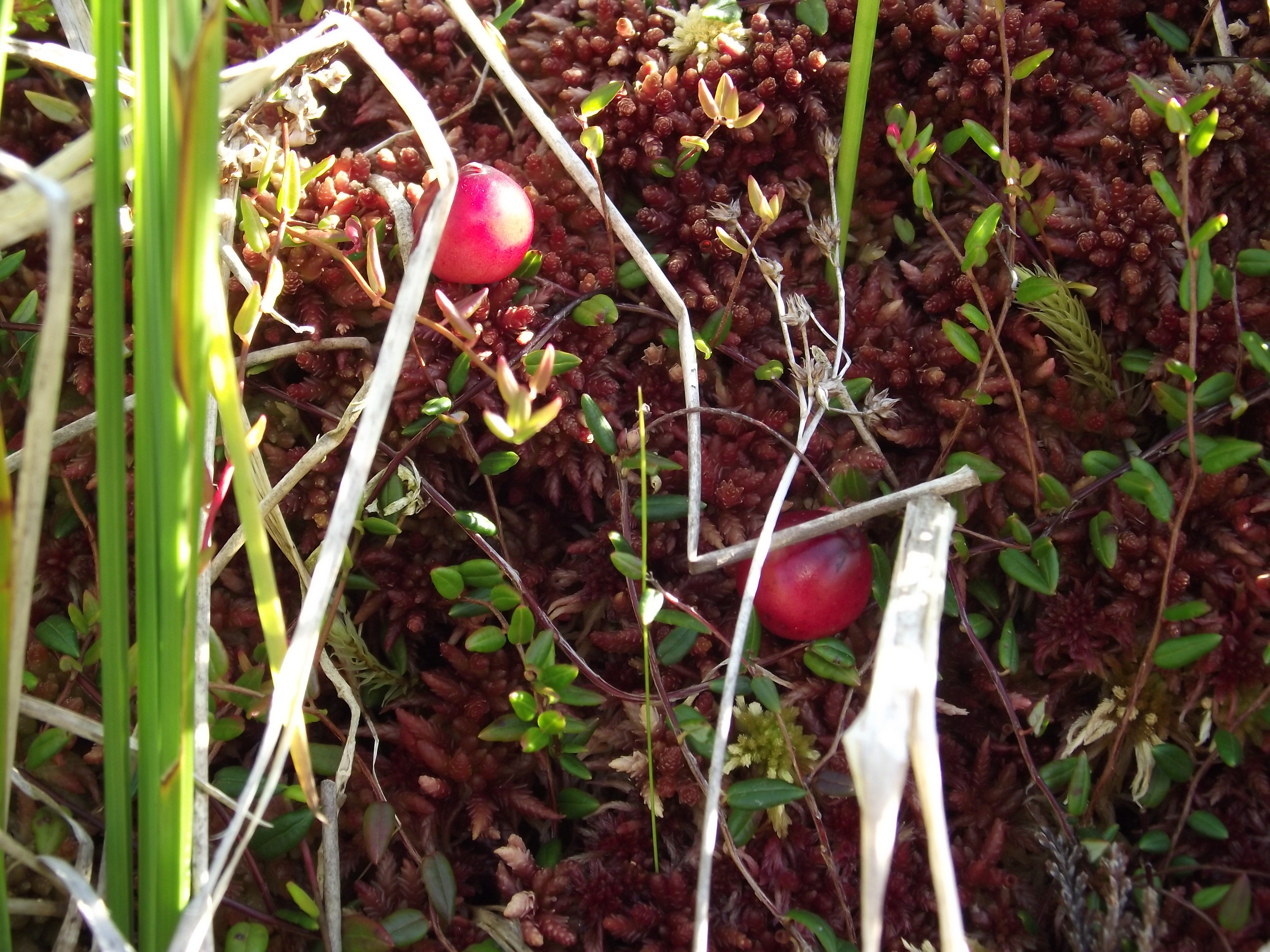
Cranberry (Vaccinium oxycoccos) fruit on a carpet of sphagnum moss

In megaphorbs, the plants are often tall (between one and two meters) and sometimes arranged in tight colonies, such as Aconitum lycoctonum subsp. vulparia, Garden monkshood (altitude > 1,200 m, highly poisonous), Siberian columbine meadow-rue, Bachelor's buttons, Adenostyles alliariae (alt. > 1,200 m), Wild Angelica and, more rarely, Carduus personata. These mountain plants can occasionally be found alongside plants such as Kingcup, Meadowsweet, or Valerian officinalis, which are common in the Massif Central in this type of ecosystem. As far as trees are concerned, the water's edge is often home to Black alder and various willow species, including some that only grow in the mountains, such as Salix pentandra and Salix bicolor.

In peat bogs, due to the lack of nutrients in the mats of sphagnum moss, the plants are often smaller and sometimes carnivorous, such as round-leaved sundew and common butterwort. Many other species inhabit the peat bogs of the Massif Central, which is what makes them so ecologically valuable. In waterlogged depressions, for example, there are purple marshlocks (Comarum palustre) or water clover (Menyanthes trifoliata), and higher up, on mounds of sphagnum moss, cranberry (Vaccinium oxycoccos and Vaccinium microcarpum), sheath-leaved cotton-grass (Eriophorum vaginatum), Bog-rosemary and marsh clubmoss. There are also Gentian pneumonanthe, Marsh gentian, Red-brown Clover (Trifolium spadiceum), Star Swertia (Swertia perennis, found mainly in Aubrac) and Globeflower (also characteristic of hygrophilous meadows). The Carex and Juncus genera are well represented, alongside rare species characteristic of high-altitude peat bogs such as Carex cespitosa, Carex chordorrhiza, Carex limosa, Carex pauciflora, Juncus alpinoarticulatus and Juncus filiformis. In the same family, there is often tufted bulrush, particularly in acidic peat bogs.

The Massif Central also boasts a number of peatland plants that are relics of the last ice age and are extremely rare in France, such as the Ligularia sibirica (Cézallier, Aubrac), Rannoch-rush, dwarf birch and downy willow; birch and willow are found in the peatlands of the Margeride and the willow is also found in the Monts Dore). There are also a number of the epiphytic orchid, Hammarbya paludosas (also known as Swamp Malaxis), in certain peat bogs in the Lozère (Aubrac, Margeride) and Limousin regions.

Lake flora includes isoetes (Isoetes lacustris and Isoetes echinospora), boreal aquatic plants that are very demanding in terms of water quality and, though very rare in France, found in a few lakes in the Cézallier and Aubrac regions as well as in a few lakes in the Pyrenees; the floating water-plantain (Luronium natans), which can be found at the edge of certain stretches of water and is protected at European level; and the dwarf water-lily (Nuphar pumila), a rare boreal species in France, which can be found in a few cold-water lakes in the Auvergne.

=== Special conditions in the South of the massif ===
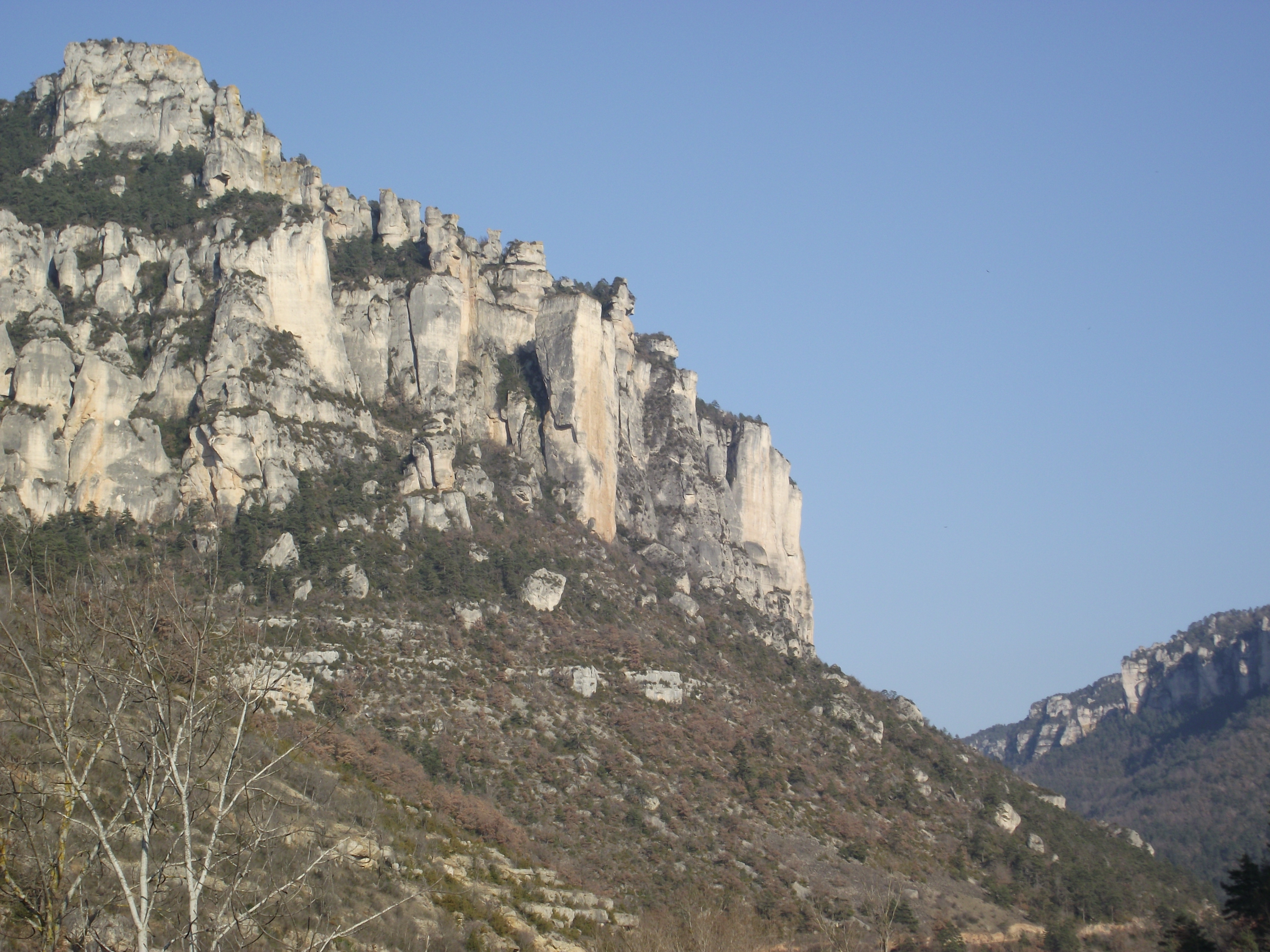
The limestone rock, which is omnipresent in the Causses region, gives rise to a very specific flora. Here, the Jonte gorges.

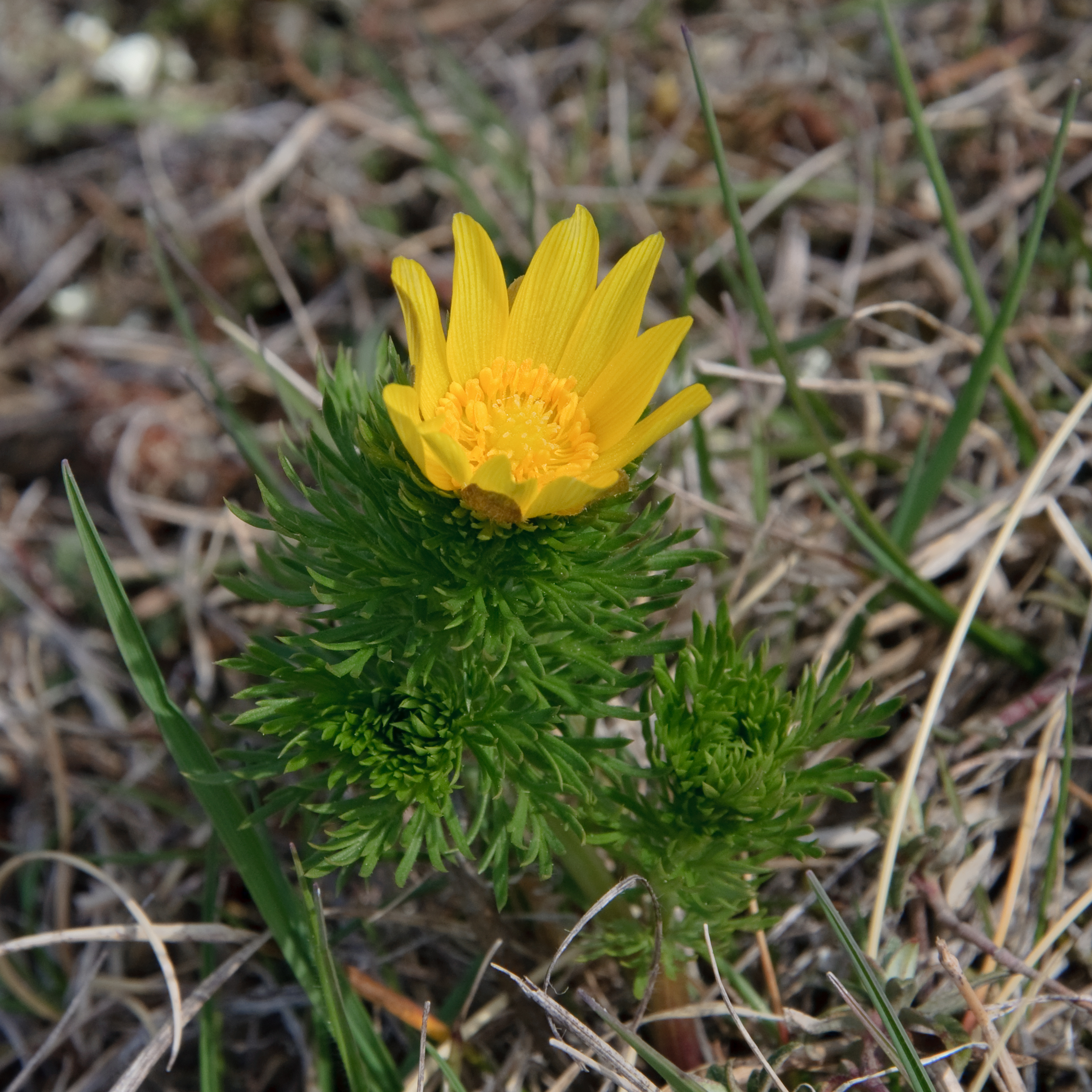
Spring Adonis (Adonis vernalis) hatching on the Causse de Sauveterre

In the south of the massif (Causses and Cévennes), the specific nature of the soil and climate has resulted in a particular flora, with a higher rate of endemism than in the rest of the Massif Central. (Note: However, this endemism must be put into perspective, as it essentially concerns only subspecies.) Beech forests are always present, particularly in the Cévennes, even on the southern slopes, which are exposed to rain from the Mediterranean (Mont Aigoual in particular). In the Causses, beech is only found on the north-facing slopes, while the southern slopes and plateaux are mainly occupied by meagre pastures, favourable to small shrubs neglected by sheep, such as boxwood (Buxus sempervirens) or juniper (Juniperus oxycedrus), sometimes with occasional oak and pine woods. These pastures are not homogeneous and are sometimes dominated by Poaceae, such as erect brome grass, blue fescue, blue moor-grass, rush-leaf fescue and Pinnate Stipe, or by other plants such as Breckland thyme, dwarf sedge or heath false brome.

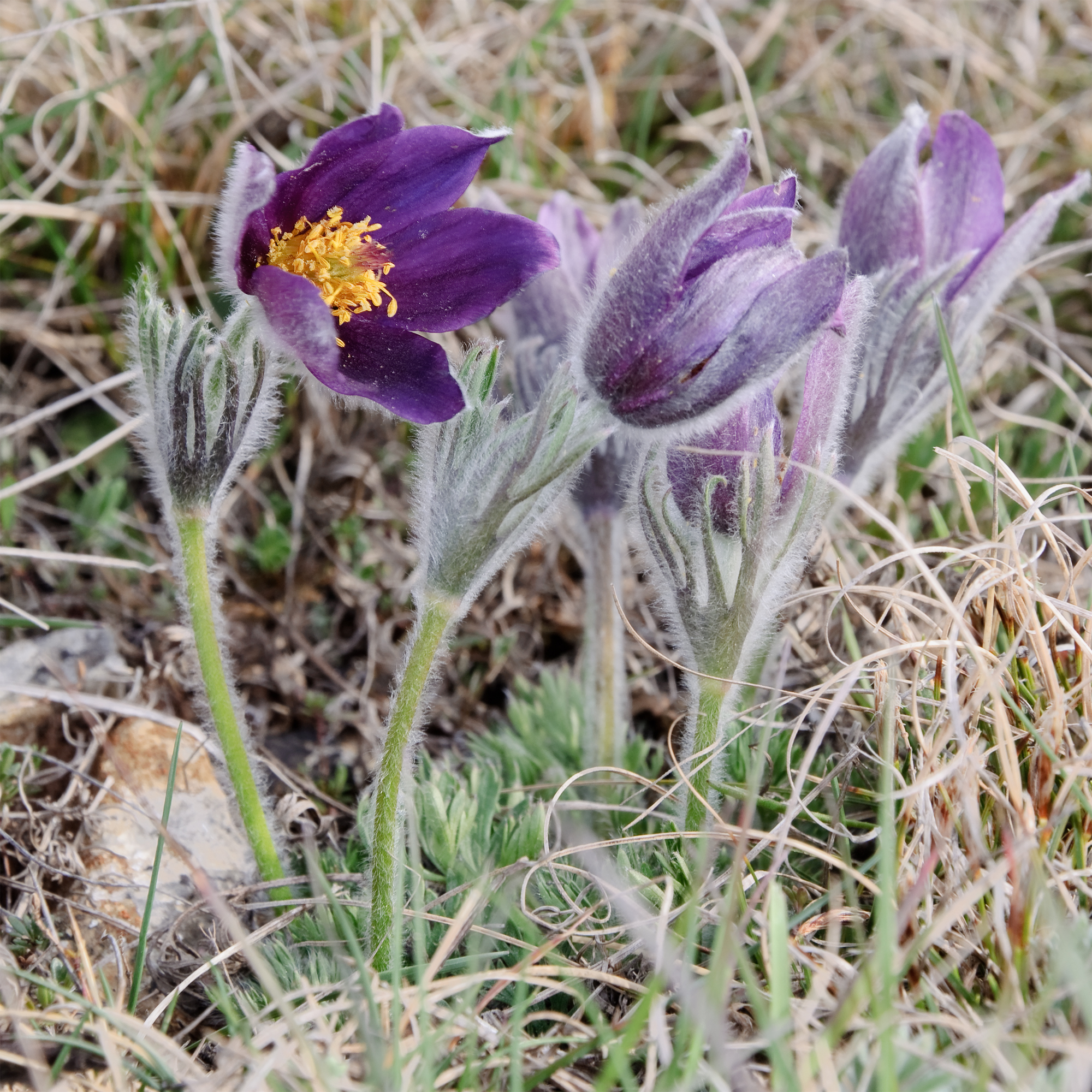
Coste Anemone (Pulsatilla vulgaris var. costeana) on the Causse de Sauveterre

Because of the limestone substrate, the flora of the Causses differs markedly from that of the rest of the Massif Central. Plants native to steppe environments, such as Stipa pennata and Lathyrus pannonicus subsp. asphodeloides, can be found here alongside dry grassland and/or limestone rockland plants, such as field eryngo (Eryngium campestre), "thistle-barometer" (Carlina acanthifolia), flax campanula (Linum campanulatum), and chalk milkwort (Polygala calcarea).

There are also more expressly Mediterranean plants, mainly in the hills but which may extend into the mountains, such as common kidney Vetch (Anthyllis vulneraria subsp. rubriflora), Pyrenean flax (Linum suffruticosum subsp. salsoloides), wallflower carnation (Dianthus caryophyllus), Orcanette (Onosma tricerosperma subsp. fastigiata), Montpellier astragalus (Astragalus monspessulanus) and true lavender (Lavandula angustifolia).

The Causses are also home to limestone mountain plants, such as mountain kidney Vetch (Anthyllis montana), Laserwort (Laserpitium siler), Daphne alpina (Daphne alpina), Daphne cneorum (Daphne cneorum), Erinus alpinus (Erinus alpinus), Hepatica nobilis (Hepatica nobilis) and Campanula speciosa (Campanula speciosa), which is native to the Pyrenees.

Plants strictly endemic to the Causses and Cévennes include Germandrée de Rouy (Teucrium rouyanum), Pulsatilla vulgaris var. costeana (on limestone grassland), Short-stemmed cinquefoil (Potentilla caulescens subsp. cebennensis), Coste's gentian (Gentiana clusii subsp. costei), a subspecies of the Alpine Aster growing at altitude (Aster alpinus subsp. cebennensis), Causses Fly Orchid (Ophrys insectifera subsp. aymoninii), Arabidopsis cebennensis (also found in Aubrac and Cantal but not further north), Saxifraga prostii (siliceous rocks), Saxifraga cebennensis (limestone rocks), long-leaved butterwort (Pinguicula caussensis, limestone rocks), Sabline de Lozère (Arenaria ligericina, limestone rocks), Columbine of Causses (Aquilegia viscosa) and glowing Thyme (Thymus nitens, siliceous soils at high altitude). Certain other species are almost endemic to the region - they are present in the Causses, the Cévennes and a limited number of neighboring regions - such as spiked sandwort (Arenaria hispida, also present in Catalonia), Pectinated Centaurea (Centaurea pectinata, also present in Provence and northern Spain) and Asarina lying down (Asarina procumbens), a particular and easy-to-recognize plant, growing on siliceous soil, strictly localized in the mountains of the Cévennes and the eastern Pyrenees.

The Causses also boast a number of Lady's-slipper orchid (Cypripedium calceolus) and the only French locations of the Spring pheasant's eye (Adonis vernalis).

=== Subalpine zone ===
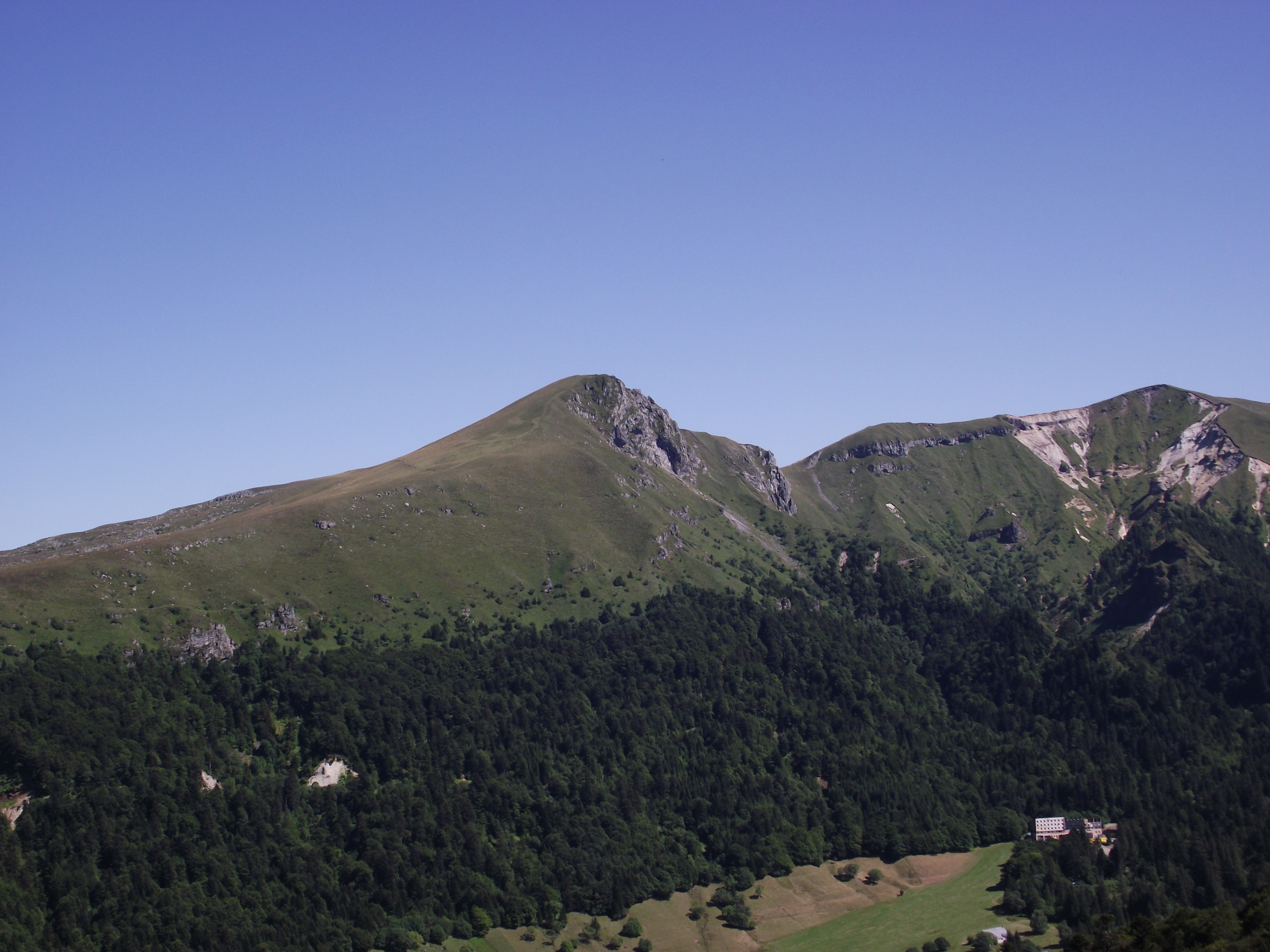
Subalpine level above the forest (the Cuzeau rock in the Monts Dore not far from the Puy de Sancy)

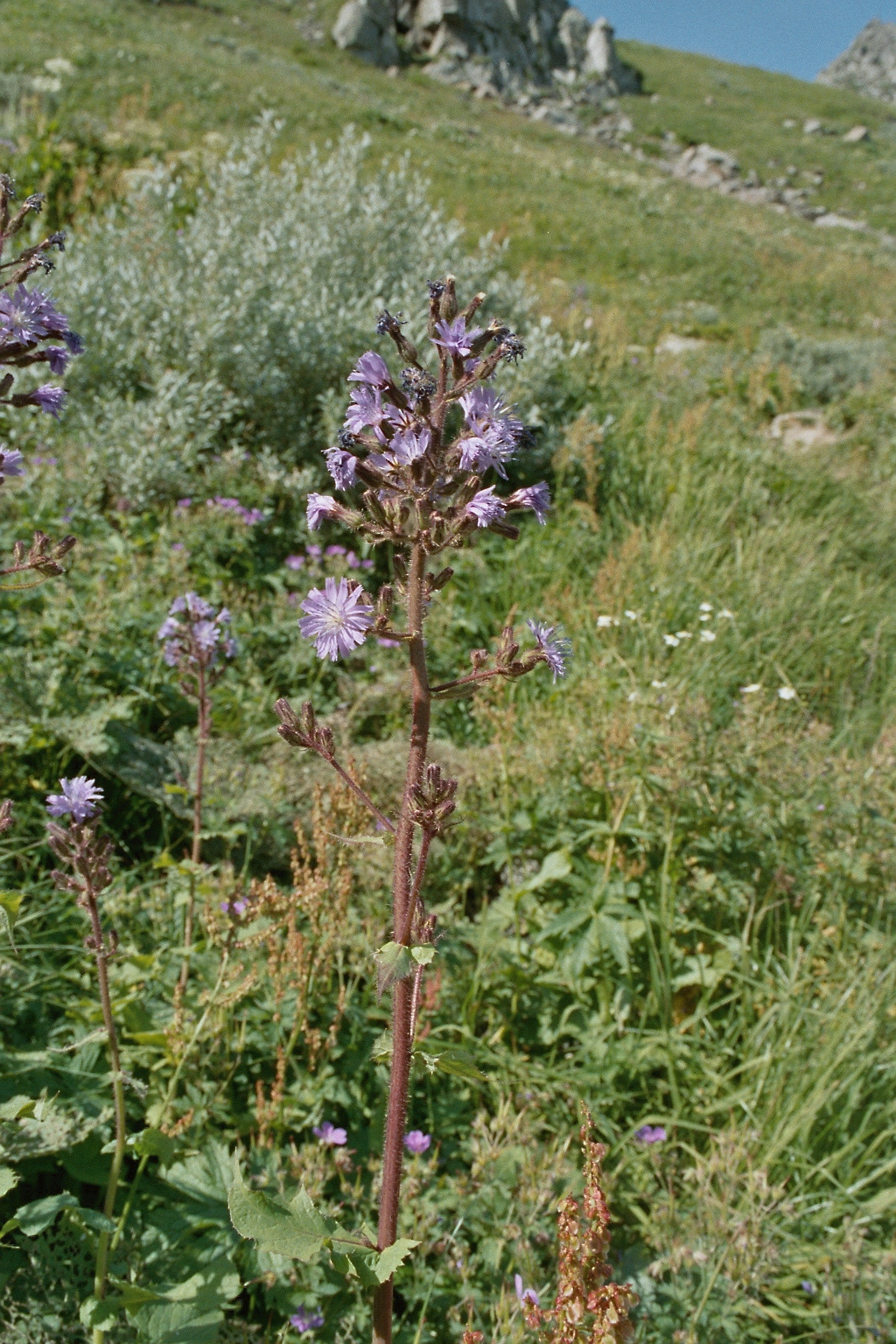
Alpine sow-thistle (Cicerbita alpina) in the Monts Dore (also found in the Cantal and Forez regions). Lapland willows (Salix lapponum) can be seen in the background.

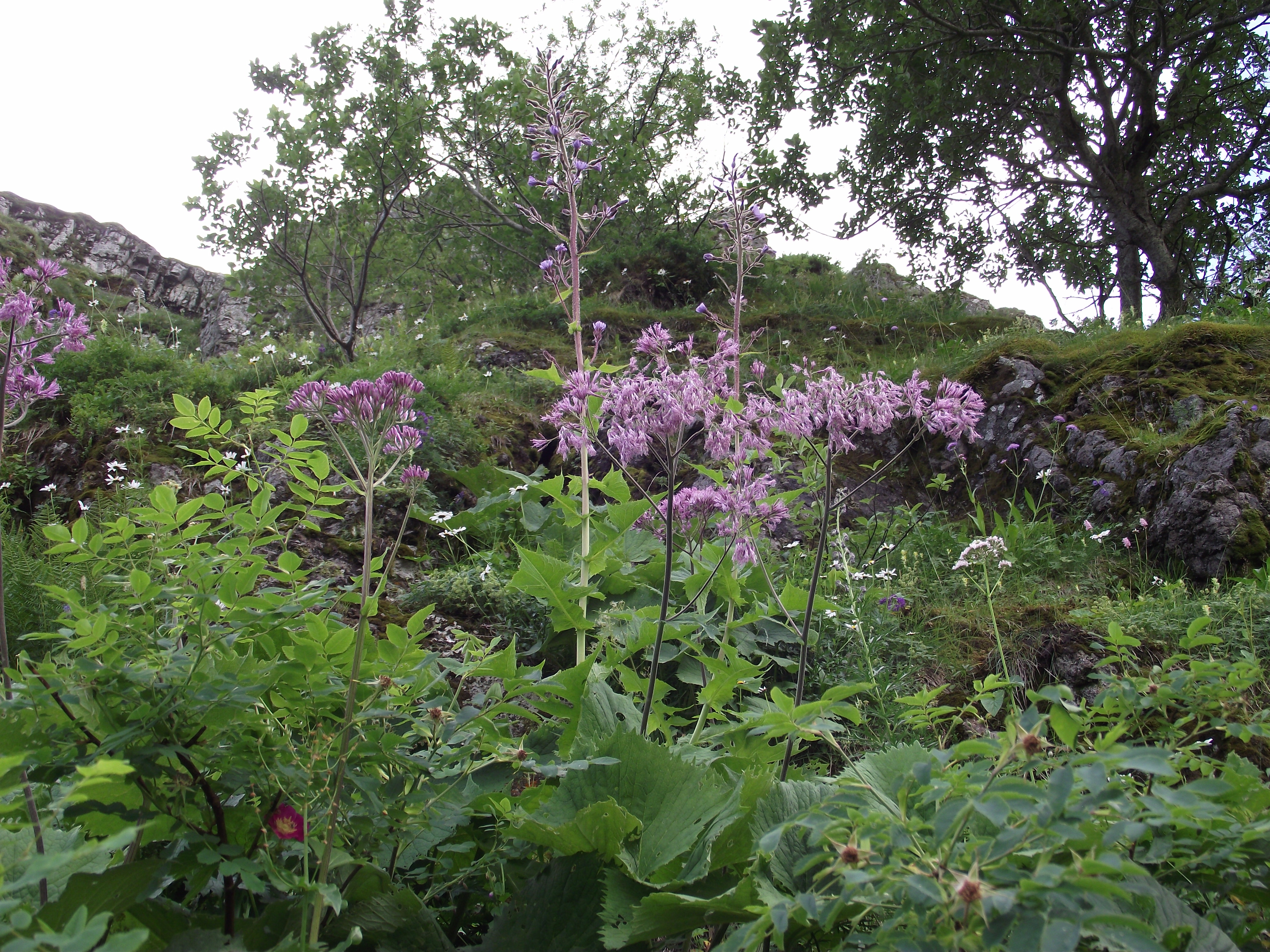
Megaphorbia in the Monts du Cantal (altitude: around 1,500 m) with, among others, Alliaria-leaved Adenostyles

Although this level occupies very little space in the Massif Central, it is nevertheless of prime ecological interest for the species it contains. This is the domain of moorland or sub-alpine (Note: Phytosociologists distinguish several types of heath or subalpine grassland in the Massif Central: heath with Spring Pulsatilla and Hairy Broom (Monts du Cantal, Monts Dore, Mézenc, from 1,650 m), heath with Yellow Gentian and Small-leaved Cranberry (Monts du Cantal, Monts Dore, between 1,600 and 1,800 m), heath with Rock Alchemilla and Marsh Cranberry (Forez, Margeride, between 1,480 and 1,650 m), Victory Garlic and Blueberry heath (Forez, Pilat, Margeride, granitic Aubrac and in an impoverished form in the volcanic massifs of Auvergne) and, in grazed areas (Cantal, Monts Dore), grassland with stiff nard, red fescue and pill sedge. Source: Subalpine acidiphilous moors of the Massif Central [archive] and Subalpine grasslands [archive], Natura 2000) grassland with a few stunted trees (beech or coniferous) due to the climatic conditions, in particular the cold temperatures and violent, even very violent, winds - the wind has blown at more than 300 km/h at the summit of Mont Aigoual. The largest areas of grassland are found in the two highest massifs: Monts Dore and Monts du Cantal. However, sub-alpine grasslands can also be found on the Forez crests, Mont Mézenc, (Note: The Mézenc has a very special type of subalpine moorland on southern exposure: the dwarf juniper and bearberry moorland, unique in the Massif Central. Source: Pelouses subalpines du Mézenc [archive], Natura 2000) Mont Lozère, and Mont Aigoual.

The plants most frequently found in heaths or sub-alpine grasslands, particularly those in the Cantal and Monts Dore, tend to be grasses, such as Nardus stricta, Festuca rubra, Poa alpina, Phleum alpinum, and Helictotrichon versicolor, but also, in less grazed areas, shrubby plants, such as myrtille, Western blueberry and hairy greenweed.They are accompanied by plants characteristic of mountain pastures, such as Alpine clover (Trifolium alpinum), Alpine plantain (Plantago alpina), great masterwort (Astrantia major), Victory onion (Allium victorialis), Masterwort (Peucedanum ostruthium) and Dyer's plumeless saw-wort (Serratula tinctoria subsp. macrocephala). Other species found in wetter areas (megaphorbs) include Rumex alpinus, Cicerbita alpina, Cicerbita plumieri and Adenostyles alliariae. The Lapland Willow can also be found here, sometimes hybridized with other willows, such as the creeping willow or the bicolored willow.

More locally, plants such as Spring pasqueflower (Pulsatilla vernalis), which grow on the Plomb du Cantal, Mézenc and Mont Lozère, and Alpine Anemone (Pulsatilla alpina), can also be seen in the Monts Dore (predominantly the white variety, subsp. alpina) and the Monts du Cantal (predominantly the yellow "sulphurous" variety, subsp. apiifolia, which is very abundant locally) alongside Alpine avens (Geum montanum - Dore and Cantal), Spring gentian (Gentiana verna - Cantal, Monts Dore), Alpine Bartsia (Bartsia alpina - Cantal only), Norwegian arctic cudweed (Omalotheca norvegica - Cantal, Monts Dore), Androsace de Haller (Androsace halleri - Scree plant of the Monts Dore and Cantal) and Alpine fleabane (Erigeron alpinus).

There are also a number of less notable species that grow at this level. This includes the St Bruno's lily (Paradisea liliastrum), a large lily with beautiful white flowers which is known to grow on Mont Aigoual and Mont Mézenc; the leucophyllus ragwort (Senecio leucophyllus), whose only station in the Massif Central is also on Mont Mézenc (a plant of the eastern Pyrenees growing on scree); Hawkweed Saxifrage (Saxifraga hieraciifolia), whose only known location in France is in the Monts du Cantal and which usually grows in arctic regions (such as Norway, Siberia, Canada) as well as in the eastern Alps and the Carpathians; Alpine coltsfoot, only recorded in the Monts du Forez in the Pierre-sur-Haute sector; Alpine snowbell (Soldanella alpina) which is only found in the Monts Dore); and eightpetal mountain-avens (Dryas octopetala) on the northern slopes of the Cantal and Monts Dore. All these plants are fragile and strictly protected by law, some, such as Dryas octopetala, being highly endangered.

There are some areas, such as Puy Mary and its surroundings, which contain a number of alpine species that are not found elsewhere in the Massif Central, such as Tozzia alpina, Saxifrage oppositifolia, Saxifraga androsacea and Pedicularis verticillata.

Endemic species include Sancy massif (puy Ferrand, puy de la Perdrix), which has a jasione that grows only on trachytic soil above 1,500 m (4,900 ft) and Jasione daine (Jasione crispa subsp. arvernensis). In the Monts Dore and Cantal, there is also a unique saxifrage: the Saxifrage de Lamotte (Saxifraga lamottei), which grows in rock crevices above 1,400 m (4,600 ft). In the same biotope (the rocks and scree at altitude in the Cantal and Monts Dore), one can also come across an endemic plant with yellow flowers, the Auvergne Biscutella (Biscutella arvernensis).

== Threats and protection ==
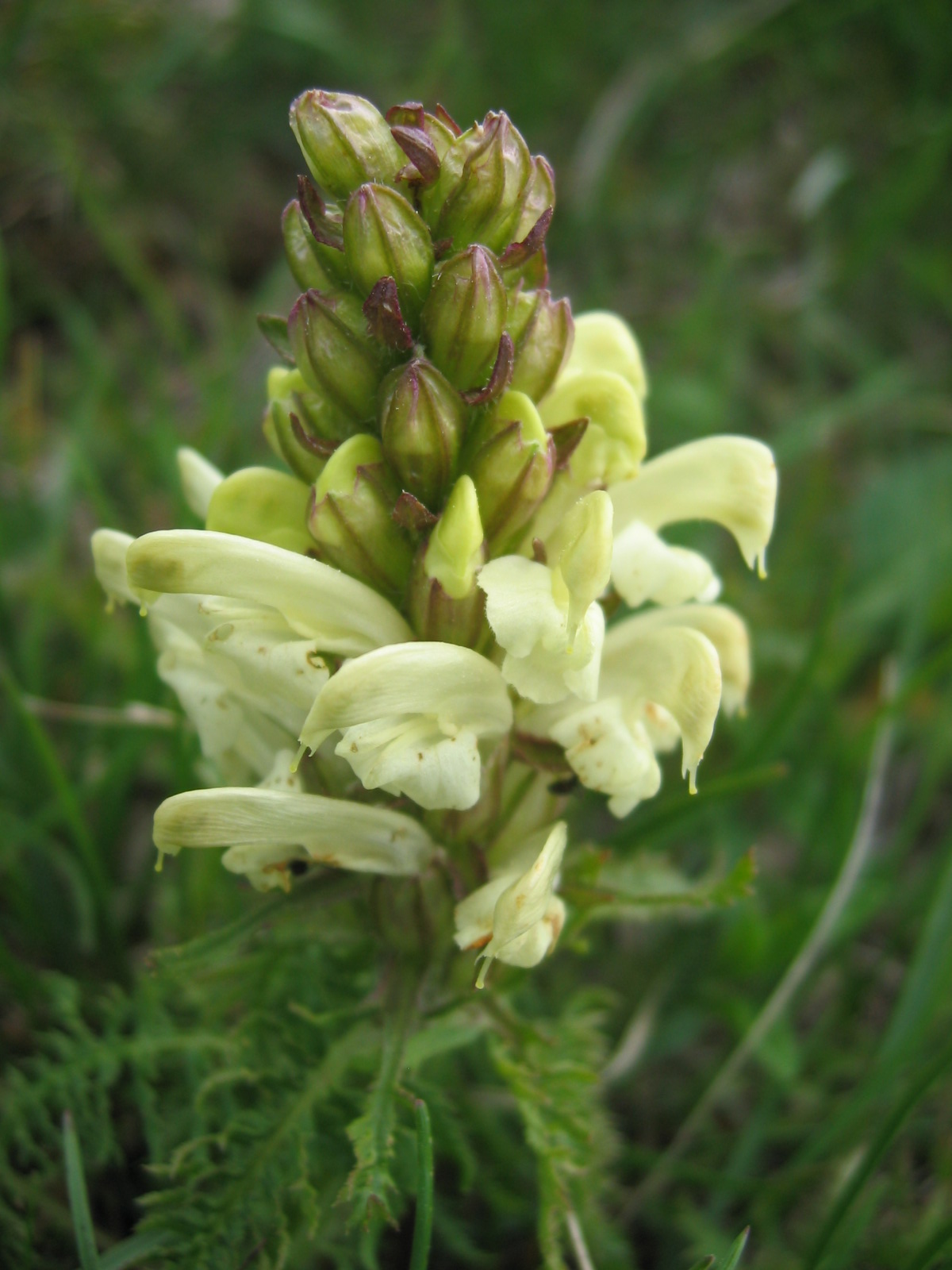
Pedicularis comosa is a mountain species that has migrated to higher altitudes and is becoming rarer.

Biodiversity in the Massif Central has declined slightly in recent years, although not to the same extent as in some neighboring regions. Around thirty species that were once present have not returned since 1990, representing a very small proportion of the total flora. This relative impoverishment is linked to the destruction of certain environments with a high heritage value, particularly wetlands, destroyed for drainage of peaty meadows and recalibration of watercourses; the intensification of agriculture leading to the disappearance or rarefaction of certain segetal species that were once common due to the use of herbicides; and the ever-increasing presence of urbanized areas, although this progression is not as rapid in the Massif Central as it is in other French regions.

There are also invasive species, often exotic, which can cause problems by expanding to the detriment of native species, such as primrose willow, in certain rivers, and ragweed. This phenomenon can also affect over-amended hay meadows, where the excessive development of neutrophilous species can compromise the quality of the fodder, such as Queen Anne's lace, which is not an exotic species but is normally confined to areas rich in nitrates.

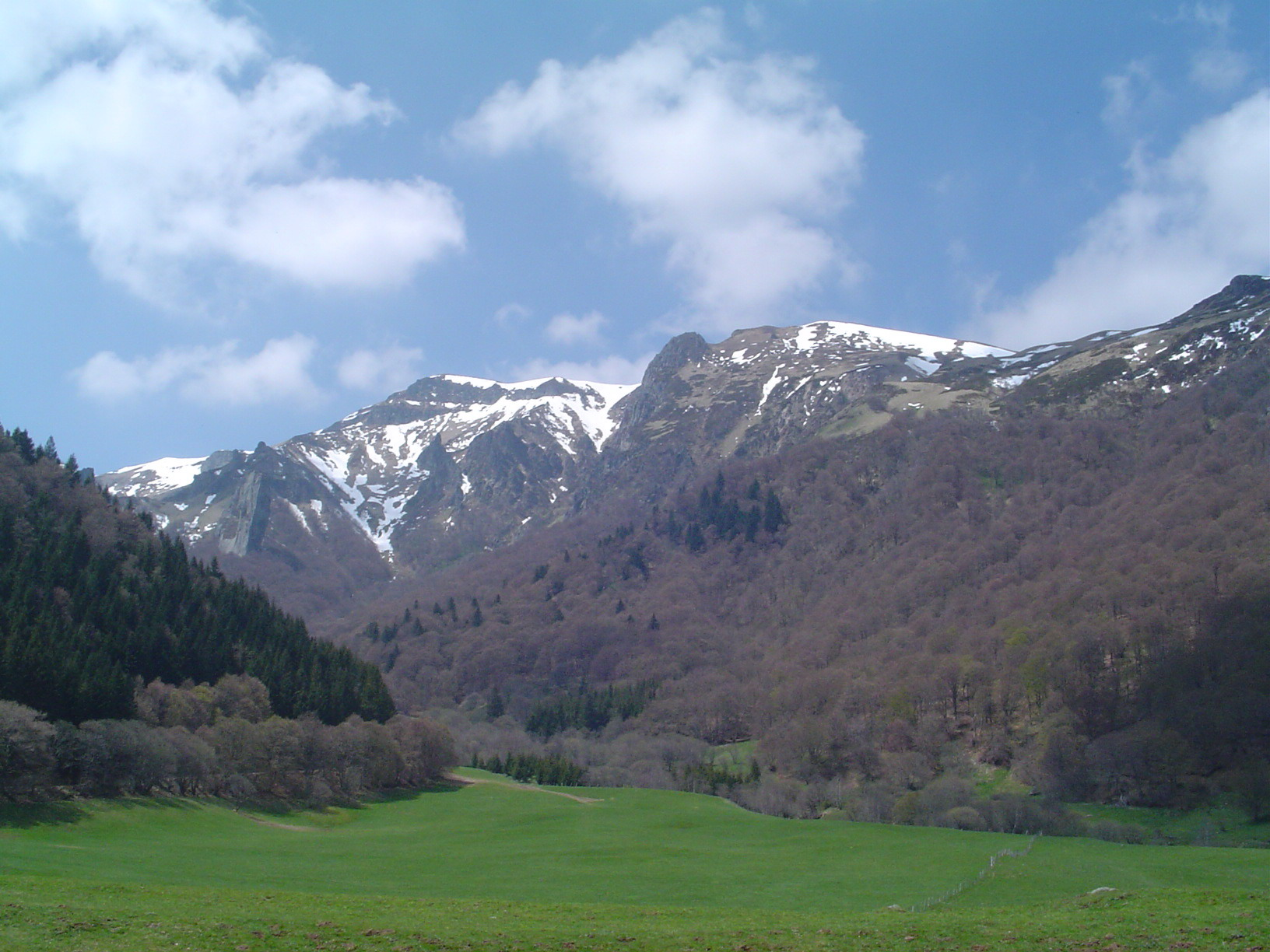
Chaudefour Valley Nature Reserve (Monts Dore)

The consequences of global warming have not yet been studied in depth. However, initial observations suggest that the impact of climate change is not yet being felt to any significant degree. In most cases, sub-alpine species, which are the most sensitive to rising temperatures, have not been observed to rise in altitude. There are, however, a few species that have migrated to higher altitudes, but whose movement is difficult to link to global warming: for example, Pedicularis comosa (Tufted Lousewort), which was once found at altitudes of over 1,200 m (3,900 ft) and is now only found at 1,500 m (4,900 ft), and Hieracium aurantiacum (Orange Hawkweed), found in abundance across in the entire massif In the eighteenth century, but now confined to higher altitudes in the Cantal and Monts Dore.

For the protection of this natural heritage, the Massif Central boasts a large number of regional nature parks, such as the Parc des Volcans, one of France's largest in terms of surface area, and, above all, the Cévennes National Park, designated by UNESCO as a biosphere reserve. The Natura 2000 network also covers vast areas, particularly in the center of the massif, such as Couzes country, Allier valley, and St Flour planèze. On the other hand, the number of nature reserves (both national and regional) is low compared to other French regions, despite the massif's great ecological interest, with the exception of the Monts Dore and Cézallier regions.

== List of plants ==
The following is a list of some of the characteristic and easily observed plants of the mountain and sub-alpine levels of the Massif Central. Common species found at all altitudes have been deliberately omitted, along with plants that are too rare and therefore difficult to observe and unrepresentative. Even with these exceptions, the list is far from exhaustive.

List of plants characteristic of the montane and subalpine levels of the Massif Central
Common name	Scientific name	Family	Natural habitat	Location	Altitude	Photographies
Garden monkshood	Aconitum napellus	Ranunculaceae	Watersides, megaphorbias	The entire massif but rare	>1 200 m	
Wolfsbane	Aconitum vulparia	Ranunculaceae	Watersides, megaphorbias	The entire massif. More common than monkshood.	>1 000 m	
Baneberry	Actaea spicata	Ranunculaceae	Beech forests	The entire massif except Causses	From 1 000 m to 1 500 m	
Alliaria-leaved adenostyle	Adenostyles alliariae	Asteraceae	Megaphorbias	High mountains	>1 200 m	
Victory onion	Allium victorialis	Liliaceae	Alpine grasslands, beech forests. Protected plant.	Monts Dore, Cantal, Aubrac	Generally >1,400 m but can drop to 1,100 m (Aubrac)	
Red cranberry	Vaccinium vitis-idaea	Ericaceae	Heaths, grasslands, peat bogs, pine forests	Mainly in the east of the massif (Margeride, Mézenc, Mont Lozère)	Subalpine, sometimes montane in the east.	
Lady's mantle	Alchemilla vulgaris	Rosaceae	Pastures, meadows, grassy areas	The entire massif	From 500 m to 1 800 m	
Alpine lady's-mantle	Alchemilla alpina subsp. saxatilis	Rosaceae	Pastures, on siliceous soil.	The entire massif	>1 000 m	
Bog-rosemary	Andromeda polifolia	Ericaceae	Peat bogs (rare). Protected plant.	Monts Dore, Cézallier, Cantal, Forez, Aubrac	From 1 000 m to 1 400 m	
Spring pasqueflower	Pulsatilla vernalis	Ranunculaceae	Subalpine grasslands	Very limited (Plomb du Cantal, Mézenc, Mont Lozère)	>1 500 m	
Alpine pasqueflower	Pulsatilla alpina	Ranunculaceae	Subalpine grasslands	Monts Dore (white variety), Cézallier, Cantal (yellow, sulphurous variety)	>1 400 m	
Mountain arnica	Arnica montana	Asteraceae	Meadows on siliceous soil	The entire massif	>1 100 m	
Sandwort	Armeria arenaria	Plumbaginaceae	Dry grasslands, sandy areas	South and centre of the massif (Cévennes, Aubrac, Vivarais)	500 m to 1 350 m	
Alpine bartsia	Bartsia alpina	Scrofulariaceae	Pastures, snow-combes, scree slopes	Cantal	>1 300 m	
Alpine avens	Geum montanum	Rosaceae	Subalpine grasslands (rare)	Monts Dore, Cantal	>1 400 m	
Water avens	Geum rivale	Rosaceae	Wet meadows, banks of streams	The entire massif	From 1 000 m to 1 500 m	
Siberian Hogweed or Lecoq's Hogweed	Heracleum sibiricum	Apiaceae	Various biotopes but preferably damp locations	Cantal, Mézenc, Aubrac, Cévennes (Note: This apiaceae from the cold regions of Europe and Asia is found in France only in the Massif Central.)	Generally above 1,000 m	
Common hedgenettle	Stachys officinalis	Lamiaceae	Meadows, moors, on siliceous soil	The entire massif	From the plain to 1,600 m	
February daphne	Daphne mezereum	Thymélacées	Beech forests	The entire massif except Causses	From 700 m to 1 500 m	
Large-flowered selfheal (Note: Large-flowered Brunelle can coexist with Pyrenean Brunelle, which looks very similar to it and with which it can hybridize.)	Prunella grandiflora	Lamiaceae	Dry grasslands, moors, open woodlands	Cantal, Aubrac	1 000 m to 1 400 m	
Large-flowered calamint (Aubrac Tea)	Calamintha grandiflora	Lamiaceae	Beech forests	Cantal, Aubrac	1 000 m to 1 500 m	
Marsh-marigold	Caltha palustris	Ranunculaceae	Streamside	The entire massif	600 m to 1 200 m	
Common heather	Calluna vulgaris	Ericaceae	Granitic moorland	Granite mountains	Especially between 1,000 m and 1,500 m	
Canneberge (Note: There are two arctic-alpine species of cranberry in the Massif Central: Vaccinium oxycoccos and Vaccinium microcarpum (the rarer small-fruited cranberry).)	Vaccinium oxycoccos	Ericaceae	Peat bogs	All the massifs except Causses. Rare, protected in France.	>1 000 m	
Five- or seven-leaved Cardamine	Cardamine pentaphyllos ou heptaphylla	Brassicaceae	Beech forests on basaltic soil	Rare : Aubrac, Cantal	From 1 000 m to 1 500 m	
Perennial cornflower	Centaurea montana	Asteraceae	Forests, rocks	Montagnes basaltiques	From 1 000 m to 1 800 m	
Hairy chervil (Note: There are several subspecies of Chaerophyllum hirsutum, some of which are also found in the massif.)	Chaerophyllum hirsutum	Apiaceae	Wet meadows and woods, stream banks	The entire massif	>500 m	
Marsh thistle	Cirsium palustre	Asteraceae (or compound)	Wet meadows, marshes, peat bogs	The entire massif sauf Causses	<1 600 m	
Brook Cirse	Cirsium rivulare	Asteraceae	Waterside, very wet areas	Aubrac, Cantal, monts Dore, Velay	>1 000 m	
Yellow thistle	Cirsium erisithales	Asteraceae	High altitude beech forests on basaltic soil	Forez, monts Dore, Cantal, Aubrac	From 1 200 m to 1 600 m	
Purple marshlocks	Comarum palustre	Rosaceae	Peat bogs, marshes	In most mountain ranges	From 1 000 m to 1 700 m	
Spring crocus	Crocus albiflorus	Iridaceae	Pastures, high altitude grasslands	In most mountain ranges	>1 200 m	
Doronic of Austria	Doronicum austriacum	Asteraceae	Wet woods, ravines.	Monts Dore, Forez, Cantal, Aubrac	From 700 m to 1 500 m	
Roundleaf sundew	Drosera rotundifolia	Droseraceae	Peat bogs (protected)	In most mountain ranges	>1 200 m	
Dogtooth violet	Erythronium dens-canis	Liliaceae	Pastures, moors	West of the massif, particularly Aubrac	>1 100 m	
Irish Euphorbia	Euphorbia hyberna	Euphorbiaceae	Pastures, moors	West of the massif, from Allier to Aubrac	>500 m	
Eyebright	Euphrasia officinalis subsp. rostkoviana	Scrofulariaceae	Pastures, moors, Nard grasslands	Granite mountains	>800 m	
Meum	Meum athamanticum	Apiaceae	Fresh altitude pastures	The entire massif	>700 m	
Snake's head fritillary	Fritillaria meleagris	Liliaceae	Occasionally in certain wet meadows	Mainly in the west (especially Aubrac)	<1 300 m	
Downy hemp-nettle	Galeopsis segetum	Lamiaceae	Rocks, gravel, sandy soils.	The entire massif, especially in granite areas.	500 m to 1 200 m	
Petty whin (Note: Petty whin is responsible for the often thorny character of many acidic heaths in the Massif Central.)	Genista anglica	Fabaceae	Granitic moors	Margeride, Aubrac, Mont Lozère, Limousin	Mountain stage, sometimes lower in the west of the massif	
Pyrenean broom	Cytisus purgans	Fabaceae	Granitic moors	Margeride, Aubrac, Cévennes	Generally above 800 m	
Arrow-jointed broom	Genista sagittalis	Fabaceae	Grasslands, moors	The entire massif	>600 m	
Field gentian	Gentianella campestris	Gentianaceae	Pastures (steep nard grasslands)	Granite mountains and basaltic	>1 000 m	
Great yellow gentian	Gentiana lutea	Gentianaceae	Mountain meadows and grasslands	Almost everywhere (except Causses)	From 600 m to 1 500 m	
Marsh gentian	Gentiana pneumonanthe	Gentianaceae	Wet moors, peat bogs	Just about everywhere (except the Causses and the Chaîne des Puys)	From 500 m to 1 500 m	
Wood cranesbill	Geranium sylvaticum	Geraniaceae	Meadows, woodland edges, mountain grasslands	Montagnes d'Auvergne, Cévennes	From 1 000 m to 1 500 m	
Knotted crane's-bill	Geranium nodosum	Geraniaceae	Woods	Cévennes, Velay especially. More scattered elsewhere in the massif.	From 500 m to 1 600 m	
Great Orpin	Hylotelephium maximum	Scrofulariaceae (succulents)	Granite rock	Granite mountains	Mountain stage	
Great masterwort	Astrantia major	Apiaceae	Meadows, mountain grasslands	Chaîne des Puys, Monts Dore, Cantal	From 800 m to 1 600 m	
Common butterwort	Pinguicula vulgaris	Lentibulariaceae	Peat bogs, watersides	Monts d'Auvergne, Mézenc	From 1 200 m to 1 400 m	
Rock currant	Ribes petraeum	Saxifragaceae	Rocky woods	Monts d'Auvergne, Aubrac, Forez, Vivarais	>1 000 m	
Masterwort	Peucedanum ostruthium	Apiaceae	Megaphorbia, grassy slopes	Monts Dore, Cantal, Mont Aigoual	Above 1,400 m	
Pyrenean squill	Scilla lilio-hyacinthus	Liliaceae	Beech woods	Monts d'Auvergne (mainly Cantal)	Mountain stage	
Jasione vivace	Jasione laevis	Campanulaceae	Rocky outcrops, dry grasslands on siliceous soil	All the massifs except Causses	>500 m	
Daffodil	Narcissus pseudo-narcissus	Amaryllidaceae	Meadows	All the massifs except Causses	>1 000 m	
Auvergne Knautie (Note: Knautia is a complex genus, with a confused taxonomy, and several species that are often closely related and easily hybridized. This is particularly true of the Auvergne knautie, which differs from the carder-leaved knautie only in the monopodial character of its development. It is found almost exclusively in the Massif Central (elsewhere, it is only found in the Pyrenees, but much more rarely). There is also a more strictly endemic, closely related species in the Massif Central: Knautia basaltica and its subspecies Knautie du Forez (Knautia basaltica var. foreziensis).)	Knautia arvernensis	Dispaceae	Meadows, paths and roadsides.	Monts d'Auvergne, Aubrac.	500 m to 1 300 m	
Sow thistle	Cicerbita plumieri	Asteraceae	Woods and grasslands at high altitudes, banks of streams	Aubrac, Cantal, Forez	>700 m	
Alpine sow-thistle	Cicerbita alpina	Asteraceae	High altitude woods and grasslands, stream banks	Cantal, Monts Dore, Forez	>1 000 m	
Broad-leaved sermountain	Laserpitium latifolium	Apiaceae	Open woods, rocky outcrops	The entire massif	>700 m	
Common cottongrass	Eriophorum angustifolium	Cyperaceae	Peat bogs, marshes	Granite mountains	>1 000 m	
Pyrenean Liondent	Leontodon pyrenaicus	Asteraceae	Volcanic mountain pastures	Monts Dore, Cantal, Aubrac.	>1 000 m	
Martagon lily	Lilium martagon	Liliaceae	Beech woods, summit grasslands (protected plant)	Monts d'Auvergne, Cévennes	>1 000 m	
Snow-white wood-rush	Luzula nivea	Joncaceae	Open, damp woods	Cantal, Aubrac, Cévennes	>800 m	
Small cow-wheat	Melampyrum sylvaticum	Orobanchaceae	Beech and fir forests	Auvergne, Forez, Aubrac, Margeride, Cévennes	>1 000 m	
Wood mushroom	Melampyrum nemorosum	Orobanchaceae	Beech and fir forests	Mainly in the east of the massif (Cévennes, Vivarais)	>800 m	(bractées violettes)
Bilberry	Vaccinium myrtillus	Ericaceae	Open woodland, moorland	The entire massif (except Causses), abundant in the east (Forez, Mézenc)	From 500 m to 1 800 m	
Poet's daffodil	Narcissus poeticus	Amaryllidaceae	Wet meadows	All the massifs	Especially from 500 m to 1 400 m	
Bog asphodel	Narthecium ossifragum	Nartheciaceae	Marshes, peat bogs	West of the massif (Atlantic plant)	up to 1,300 m	
Seguier's pink	Dianthus seguieri subsp. pseudocollinus	Caryophyllaceae	High altitude grasslands and woods	All massifs except Causses (endemic to the Massif Central)	>700 m	
Fragrant orchid	Gymnadenia conopsea var. densiflora	Orchidaceae	Mountain pastures, moors	Monts d'Auvergne, Aubrac	>1 000 m	
Elder-flowered orchid	Dactylorhiza sambucina	Orchidaceae	Mountain pastures, moors	Relatively frequent except on dry ground	>1 000 m	
Spotted orchid	Dactylorhiza maculata	Orchidaceae	Rich, moist meadows, often on silica.	The entire massif	>500 m	
Greater broomrape	Orobanche rapum-genistae	Orobanchaceae	Purgative broom moorland	Aubrac, Margeride, Cévennes	>1 000 m	
Spiky thorn	Sedum hirsutum	Crassulaceae	Granitic rock	Granitic massifs (Aubrac, Margeride, Forez...)	500 m to 1 500 m	
Grass-of-Parnassus	Parnassia palustris	Parnassiaceae	Mountain pastures, peat bogs	The entire massif	>1 000 m	
Common lousewort	Pedicularis sylvatica	Scrofulariaceae	Wet moorland	The entire massif	Up to 1,700 m	
Marsh lousewort	Pedicularis palustris	Scrofulariaceae	Peat bogs, wet moors	Just about everywhere except Monts Dômes	From 1 000 m to 1 400 m	
Leafy lousewort	Pedicularis foliosa	Scrofulariaceae	High altitude pastures	Monts Dore, Cantal	>1 200 m	
Mountain pansy	Viola lutea (blue-violet in colour in the Massif Central)	Violaceae	Mountain pastures	Auvergne	>1 000 m	
False lily of the valley	Maïanthemum bifolium	Liliaceae	Beech forests	The entire massif	800 m to 1500 m	
Siberian columbine meadow-rue	Thalictrum aquilegifolium	Ranunculaceae	Megaphorbia, wet meadows	Found here and there, more common in Haute-Loire and Lozère	>800 m	
Great burnet	Sanguisorba officinalis	Rosaceae	Peat bogs, wet meadows	The entire massif, common in Aubrac	>800 m	
Golden cinquefoil	Potentilla aurea	Rosaceae	Grasslands, rocks, open woods	Monts d'Auvergne, Aubrac	>1 200 m	
Purple Prenanthe	Prenanthes purpurea	Asteraceae	Beech woods	Auvergne, Aubrac, Cévennes	>1 000 m	
Lungwort	Pulmonaria affinis	Boraginaceae	Forests (Ash, Beech, Oak...)	The entire massif, endemic to south-west France and Spain.	Hill and mountain levels	
Red Pasque Flower	Pulsatilla rubra	Ranunculaceae	Pastures, dry moors	Eastern slopes of mountain ranges, endemic to the Massif Central.	>800 m	
Spiked rampion (Note: This subspecies of the spiked raywort is blue in color. It is the most common in the Massif Central, and its color is more intense at higher altitudes. Another subspecies, very similar but more robust, grows at higher altitudes: the alpestre raiponce (Phyteuma spicatum subsp. alpestre). These two taxa should not be confused with Phyteuma gallicum, a rarer and smaller Massif Central endemic.)	Phyteuma spicatum subsp. occidentale	Campanulaceae	Beech woods, meadows	Present almost everywhere	>800 m	
Hemispheric Rapunzel	Phyteuma hemisphaericum	Campanulaceae	Mountain grassland	High mountains	>1,500 m (>1,000 m in the Cévennes and Mézenc)	
Aconite-leaf buttercup	Ranunculus aconitifolius	Ranunculaceae	Wet meadows, stream banks	Present everywhere except in the Causses	>1 000 m	
Common bistort	Polygonum bistorta	Campanulaceae	Beech woods, meadows	Monts Dore, Cantal, Livradois, Forez, Aubrac, Cévennes	Generally above 1,000 m	
Mountain Reed	Calamagrostis arundinacea	Poaceae	Beech forests, on acid soil.	The entire massif	above 1,000 m	
Alpine rose	Rosa pendulina	Rosaceae	Open forests, bushes	Monts d'Auvergne, Mézenc, Aubrac	>900 m	
Starry saxifrage	Saxifraga stellaris	Saxifragaceae	Mountain pastures, high-altitude peat bogs	Monts d'Auvergne, Aubrac	>1 200 m	
Whorled Solomon's-seal	Polygonatum verticillatum	Liliaceae	Beech forests	Monts Dore, Cantal, Aubrac, Cévennes	>1 000 m	
Alpine squill	Scilla bifolia	Liliaceae	Meadows, woods	Plutôt à l'ouest	From the plain to 1,600 m	
Adonis ragwort	Senecio adonidifolius	Asteraceae	Moors on siliceous soil	Monts d'Auvergne, Livradois, Forez, Mézenc, Margeride, Aubrac.	1 000 m to 1 700 m	
Wood ragwort	Senecio ovatus	Asteraceae	Mountain forests	Monts d'Auvergne, Forez	500 m to 1 500 m	
Cacaliaster ragwort	Senecio cacaliaster	Asteraceae	Fresh woods on volcanic mountains	Monts d'Auvergne, Aubrac	>1 200 m	
Dyer's plumeless saw-wort	Serratula tinctoria subsp. monticola. (Note: This subspecies may also be referred to as macrocephala (the large-headed serratula).)	Asteraceae	Woods, moors	Auvergne, Aubrac, Margeride	>1 100 m	
European goldenrod	Solidago virgaurea	Asteraceae	Dry woods, clearings, rocky areas	The entire massif	Preferably above 500 m	
Alpine penny-cress	Noccaea caerulescens	Brassicaceae	High altitude pastures, on silica.	Monts d'Auvergne, Aubrac, Cévennes.	>1 000 m	
Brown clover	Trifolium badium	Fabaceae	Wet meadows and rocky areas	Monts d'Auvergne, Cévennes	>1 400 m	
Red-brown clover	Trifolium spadiceum	Fabaceae	Prairies humides	The entire massif	From 800 m to 1 600 m	
Alpine clover	Trifolium alpinum	Fabaceae	Wet meadows	Auvergne, Cévennes, Vivarais	>1 300 m	
Globeflower	Trollius europaeus	Ranunculaceae	Wet meadows	The entire massif sauf Causses	From 800 m to 1 500 m	
False helleborine (« baraïre » in occitan)	Veratrum album	Liliaceae	Wet meadows, pastures	The entire massif sauf Causses	>800 m	

== See also ==
=== Related articles ===
- List of protected plant species in Auvergne
- Massif Central
- Cézallier Massif

=== Bibliography ===
Chronological order:

- ^{(fr)} Gérard Joberton, Yves Perret, Thierry Dalbavie, Arbres et fleurs de nos montagnes, De Borée, 1991 (ISBN 2-908592-08-8)
- ^{(fr)} Francis Nouyrigat, Fleurs et paysages d'Aubrac, Éditions du Rouergue, 1998 (ISBN 2-84156-084-8).
- ^{(fr)} Noël Graveline, Jean-Paul Favre, Francis Debaisieux, Fleurs familières et méconnues du massif central, Debaisieux, 2000 (ISBN 2-913381-05-7)
- ^{(fr)} Philippe Antonetti, Éric Brugel, Francis Kessler, Maryse Tort, Jean-Pierre Barbe, Atlas de la flore d'Auvergne, Chavaniac-Lafayette : Conservatoire national du Massif central, 2006 (ISBN 978-2-9524722-0-3)
- ^{(fr)} Hervé Christophe, Fleurs des volcans, sommets du Cantal et d'Auvergne, Biome, 2007 and 2011 (ISBN 978-2-9529409-1-7)
