= Alpine fleabane =

Alpine fleabane is a common name for several plants and may refer to:

- Erigeron alpiniformis, native to northern Canada and Greenland
- Erigeron alpinus, native to Europe
- Erigeron borealis, native to Greenland, Labrador, and Nunavut
