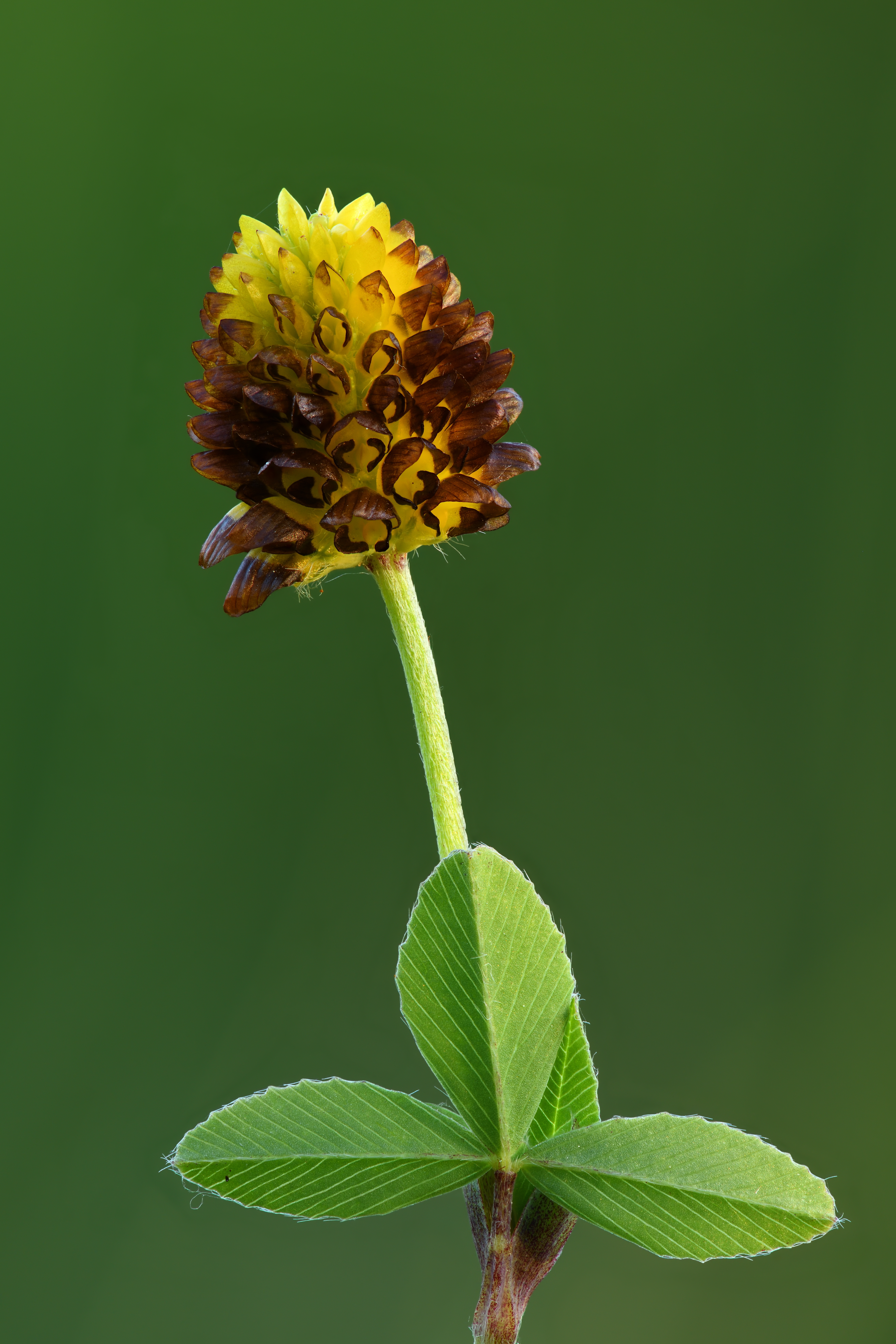

Scientific classification
- Kingdom: Plantae
- Clade: Tracheophytes
- Clade: Angiosperms
- Clade: Eudicots
- Clade: Rosids
- Order: Fabales
- Family: Fabaceae
- Subfamily: Faboideae
- Genus: Trifolium
- Species: T. spadiceum

Binomial name
- Trifolium spadiceum L.

= Trifolium spadiceum =

Species of legume

Trifolium spadiceum is a species of flowering plant belonging to the family Fabaceae.

Its native range is Europe to Western Siberia and Iran.

Synonyms:

- Chrysaspis spadicea (L.) Greene
- Trifolium litigiosum Desv.
