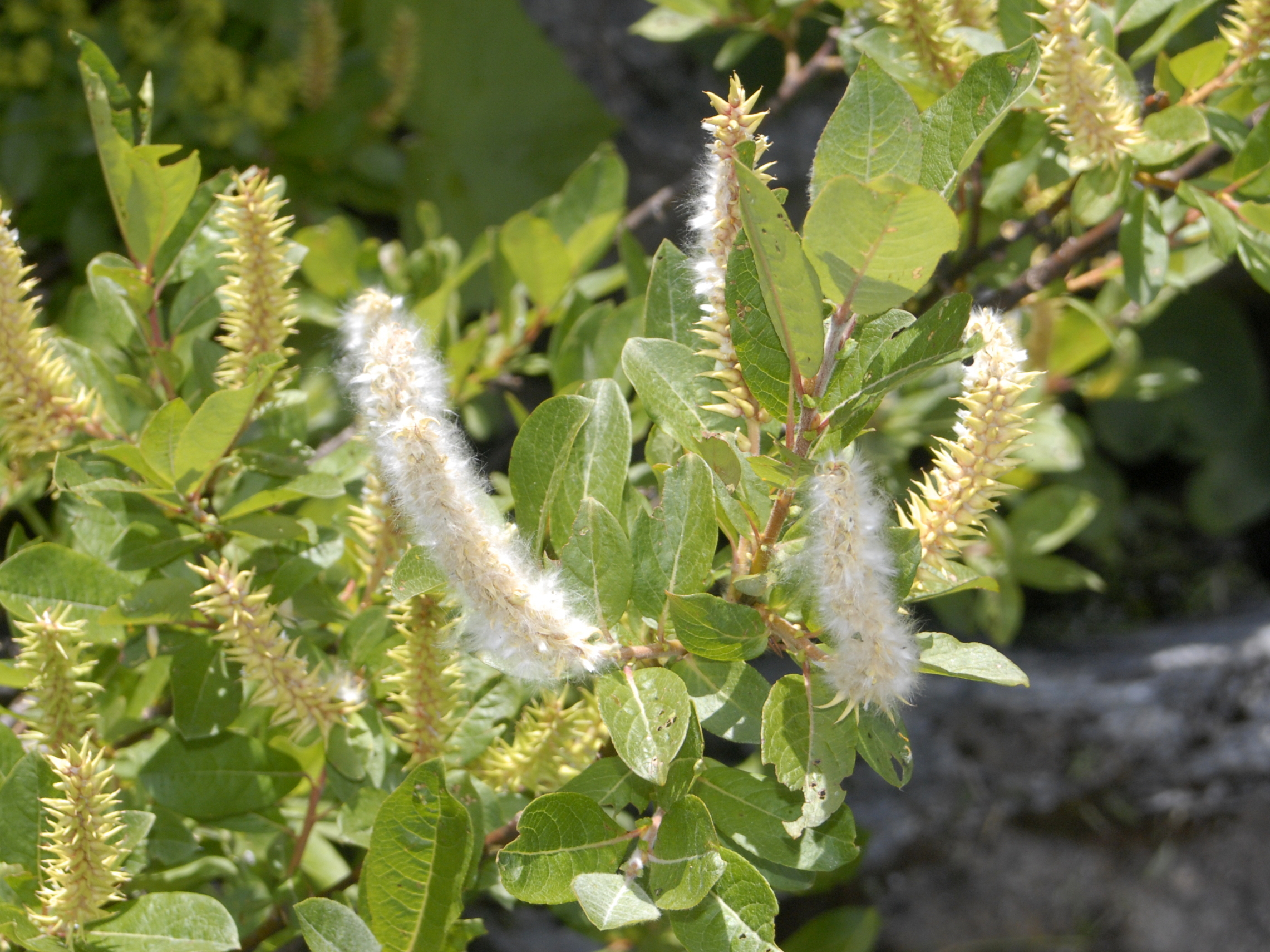
- Salix bicolor at the Giardino Botanico Alpino Chanousia

Scientific classification
- Kingdom: Plantae
- Clade: Tracheophytes
- Clade: Angiosperms
- Clade: Eudicots
- Clade: Rosids
- Order: Malpighiales
- Family: Salicaceae
- Genus: Salix
- Species: S. bicolor

Binomial name
- Salix bicolor Willd.

Synonyms
- Salix schraderiana Willd.; Salix weigeliana Willd.; Salix weigoliana Willd.

= Salix bicolor =

Species of flowering plant

Salix bicolor is a species of flowering plant in the family Salicaceae (willows).

== Description ==
Salix bicolor can reach a height of 30–50 centimetres (12–20 in). This plant usually develop into a large shrub, but may grow as a multi branched tree of up to 4 m height. Branches are glabrous, brown-reddish or chestnut color. Leaves are yellow-green, glabrous, elliptical or lanceolate with acute apex. They are 5–8 centimetres (2.0–3.1 in) long and 2–3 centimetres (0.79–1.18 in) wide. The catkins are produced in early spring, before the leaves. They reach 3 × 1 cm, on long peduncles with lanceolate bracts. Like all willows, this species is dioecious. Flowers bloom from May to June.

== Distribution ==
It is present in mountains of Southern Europe.

== Habitat ==
This species can be found near streams, waterways and moist subalpine pastures at elevation of 1,650–2,350 metres (5,410–7,710 ft) above sea level.
