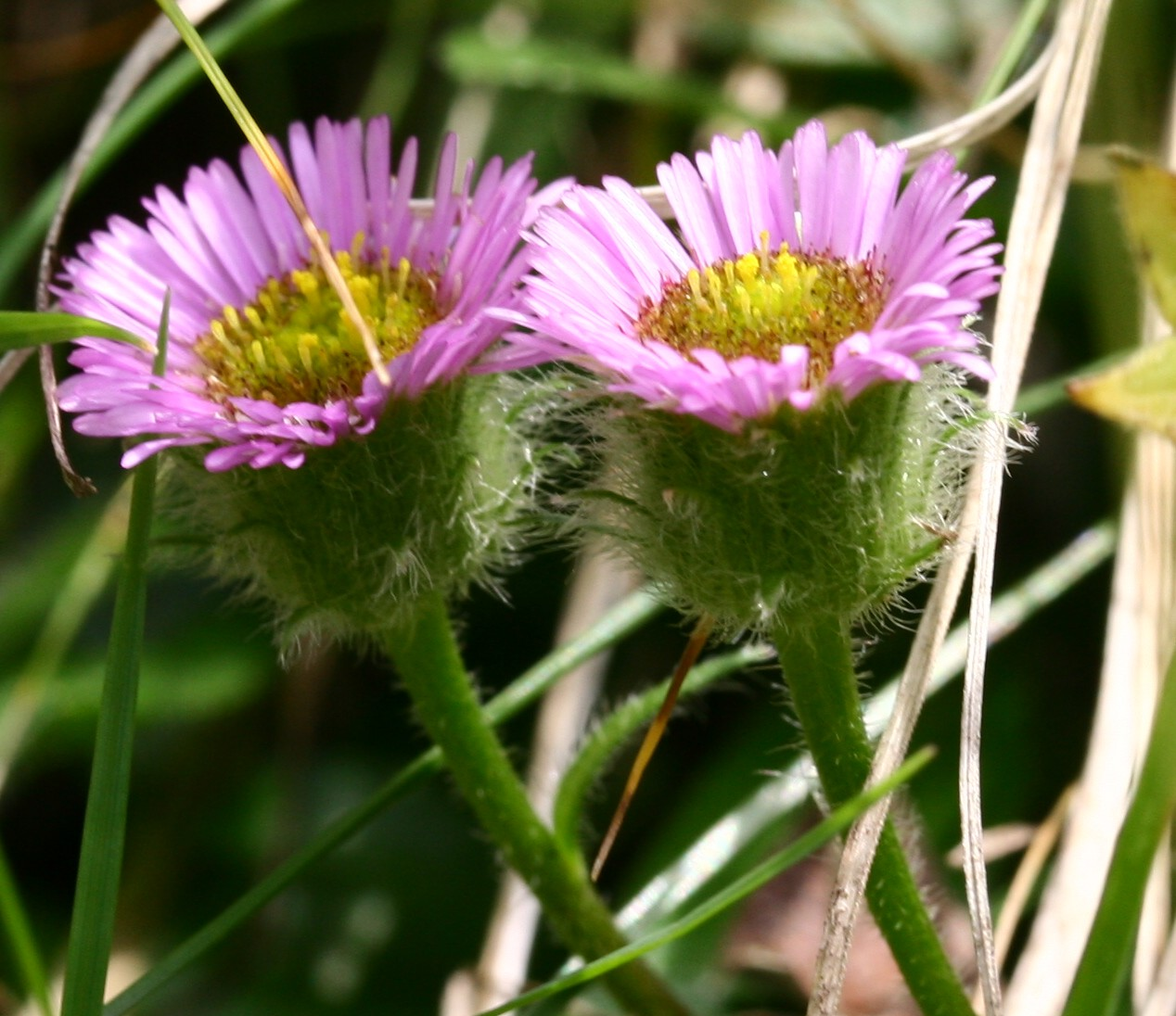

Scientific classification
- Kingdom: Plantae
- Clade: Embryophytes
- Clade: Tracheophytes
- Clade: Angiosperms
- Clade: Eudicots
- Clade: Asterids
- Order: Asterales
- Family: Asteraceae
- Genus: Erigeron
- Species: E. alpinus

Binomial name
- Erigeron alpinus L.

Synonyms
- Synonymy: Aster pyrenaicus Pourr.; Erigeron hirsutus Bluff & Fingerh.; Erigeron prantlii Dalla Torre; Erigeron pyrenaicus (Desf. ex DC.) Rouy; Trimorpha alpina (L.) Gray; Erigeron intermedius Rchb., syn of subsp. intermedius; Trimorpha intermedia (Rchb.) Vierh., syn of subsp. intermedius; Erigeron rhodopaeus (Vierh.) Hayek, syn of subsp. rhodopaeus; Trimorpha rhodopaea Vierh., syn of subsp. rhodopaeus

= Erigeron alpinus =

Species of flowering plant in the daisy family

Erigeron alpinus, the alpine fleabane, is a European species of perennial plant in the family Asteraceae. It is widespread across much of Europe except the far north.

Erigeron alpinus is an herb up to 30 cm (12 in) tall, with spoon-shaped, hairy, medium green leaves. The plants flowers are narrow and have a thread-like ray florets, which are made out of 2 or more rows. In the summer the flower heads have lilac-blue to red-purple ray florets surrounding greenish-yellow disc florets, and are 3.75 cm (1 1/2 in) tall.

Subspecies

- Erigeron alpinus subsp. alpinus
- Erigeron alpinus subsp. intermedius (Rchb.) Pawł.
- Erigeron alpinus subsp. rhodopaeus (Vierh.) Kožuharov & N.Andreev
