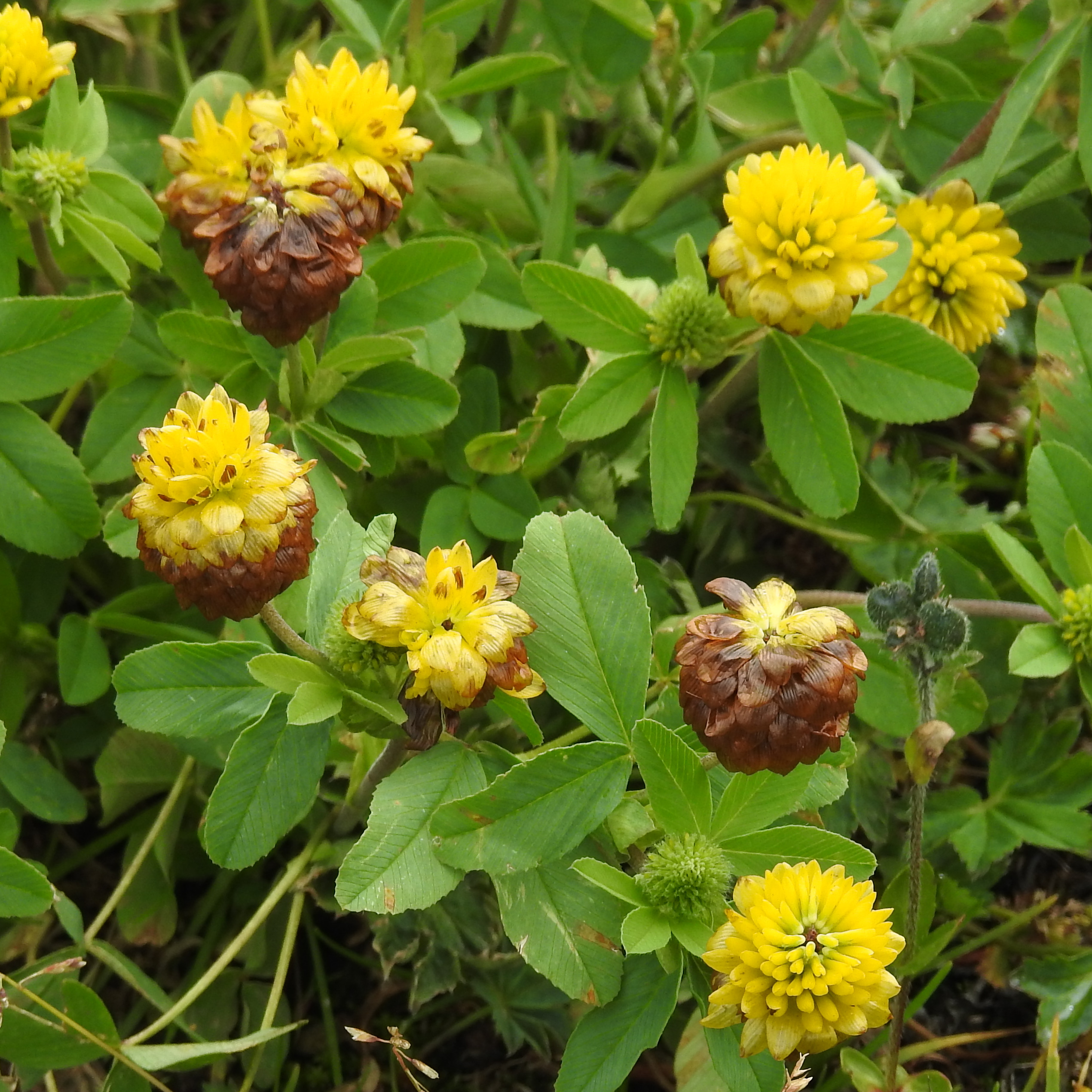
- In the Austrian Alps
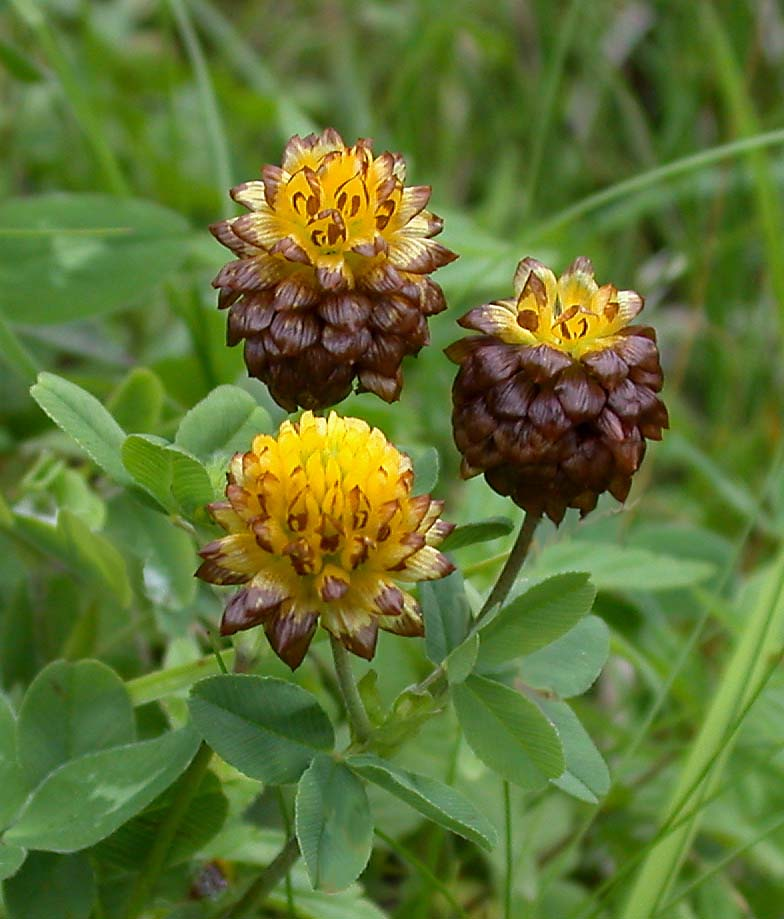
- Close-up of flowers

Scientific classification
- Kingdom: Plantae
- Clade: Tracheophytes
- Clade: Angiosperms
- Clade: Eudicots
- Clade: Rosids
- Order: Fabales
- Family: Fabaceae
- Subfamily: Faboideae
- Genus: Trifolium
- Species: T. badium

Binomial name
- Trifolium badium Schreb.

Synonyms
- List: Chrysaspis badia (Schreb.) Greene; Chrysaspis badia subsp. rytidosemia (Boiss. & Hohen.) Hendrych; Chrysaspis rytidosemia (Boiss. & Hohen.) Roskov; Trifolium badium subsp. rivulare (Boiss. & Balansa) C.C.Towns.; Trifolium cousturieri Gand.; Trifolium ponticum Albov; Trifolium pseudobadium Velen.; Trifolium rivulare Boiss. & Balansa; Trifolium rytidosemium Boiss. & Hohen.; Trifolium rytidosemium subsp. rivulare (Boiss. & Balansa) Ponert; Trifolium soldeanum Barnola

= Trifolium badium =

Species of plant in the legume family

Trifolium badium, the brown clover or brown trefoil, is a species of flowering plant in the family Fabaceae, native to most of mainland Europe, the Caucasus, Turkey, Iraq, and Iran. It is a locally important forage in sub-alpine pastures.

== Subtaxa ==
The following subspecies are accepted:

- Trifolium badium subsp. badium – entire range, except Turkey
- Trifolium badium subsp. rytidosemium (Boiss. & Hohen.) M.Hossain – Turkey, Iraq
