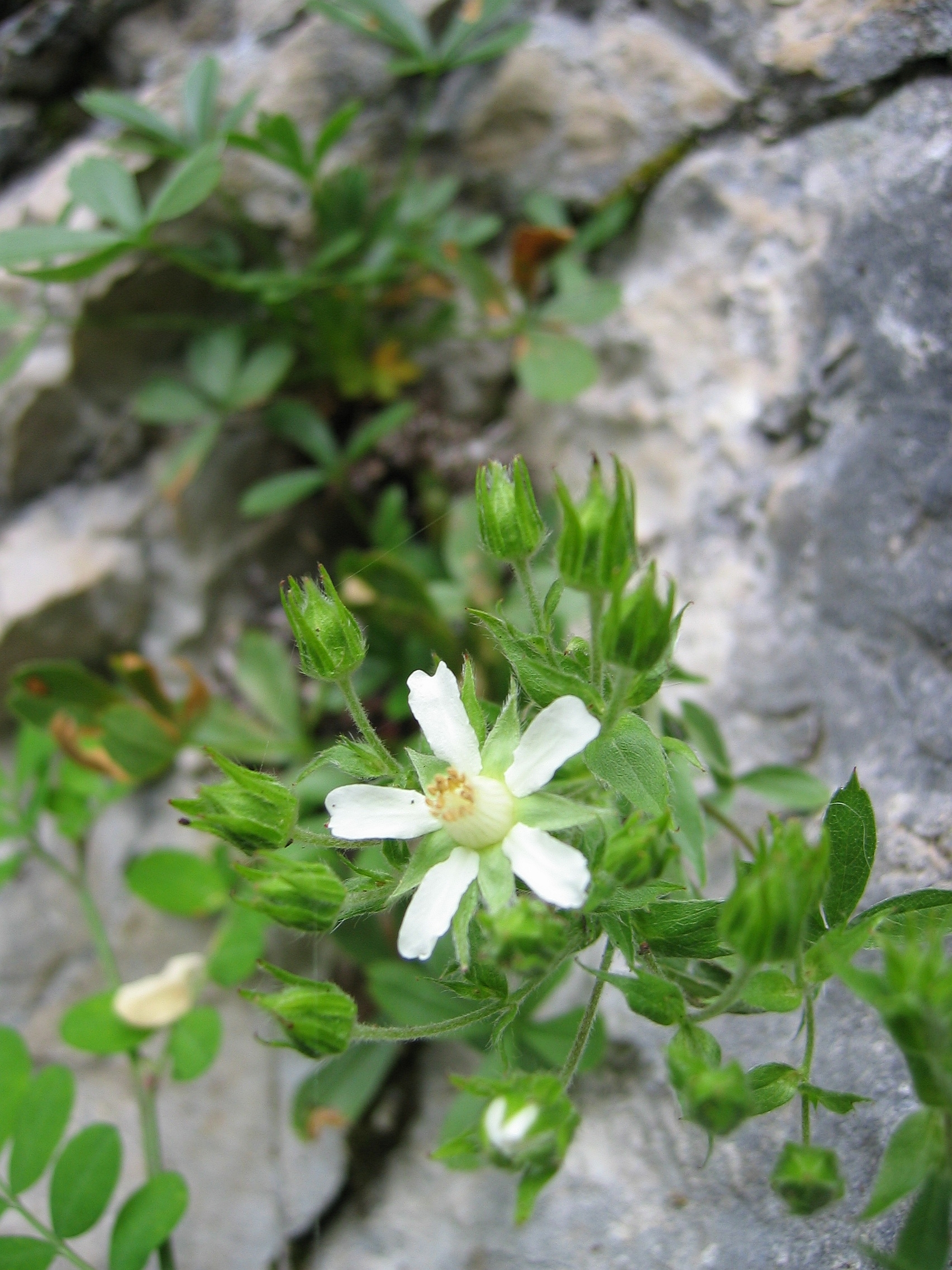

Scientific classification
- Kingdom: Plantae
- Clade: Embryophytes
- Clade: Tracheophytes
- Clade: Angiosperms
- Clade: Eudicots
- Clade: Rosids
- Order: Rosales
- Family: Rosaceae
- Genus: Potentilla
- Species: P. caulescens

Binomial name
- Potentilla caulescens L., 1756

Synonyms
- List: Dasiphora jacquinii Raf.; Fragaria caulescens (L.) Crantz; Fragariastrum caulescens (L.) Schur; Fragariastrum petiolatum (Gaudin) Schur; Fragariastrum petiolulatum (Gaudin) Schur; Potentilla alba Cav. & Pourr. ex Willk.; Potentilla alba var. caulescens Lam.; Potentilla caulescens subsp. caulescens; Potentilla caulescens var. cebennensis Siegfr. ex Debeaux; Potentilla caulescens subsp. cebennensis (Siegfr. ex Debeaux) Kerguélen; Potentilla caulescens subsp. iserensis Soják; Potentilla caulescens var. petiolulata (Gaudin) Lamotte; Potentilla caulescens subsp. petiolulata (Gaudin) Nyman; Potentilla caulescens var. petiolulosa Ser.; Potentilla caulescens subsp. petiolulosa (Ser.) Arcang.; Potentilla caulescens var. petrophila (Boiss.) Th.Wolf; Potentilla caulescens subsp. petrophila (Boiss.) Nyman; Potentilla caulescens var. sericea Coss.; Potentilla caulescens var. villosa Boiss.; Potentilla corymbosa Pourr.; Potentilla kristofiana Zimmeter; Potentilla petiolulata Gaudin; Potentilla petiolulosa (Ser.) Strobl; Potentilla petrophila Boiss.; Trichothalamus caulescens (L.) Spreng.; Trichothalamus petiolulatus (Gaudin) Fourr.

= Potentilla caulescens =

Species of flowering plant in the rose family

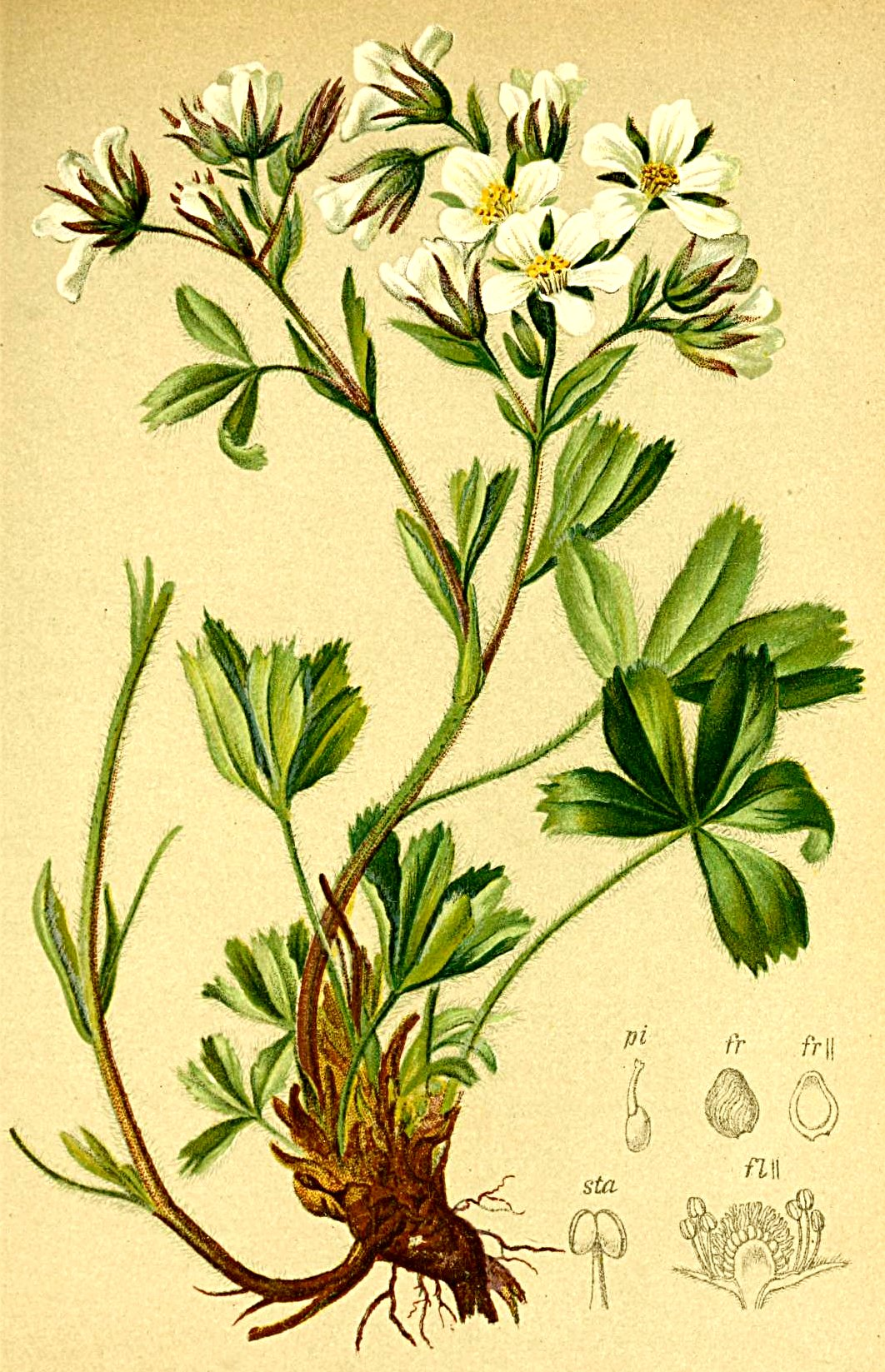

Potentilla caulescens, also known as the short-stemmed cinquefoil, is a perennial herbaceous species of flowering plant in the rose family, Rosaceae.

It is native to Europe, where it lives throughout the Alps as well as mountains in southern Europe and the Atlas Mountains in northern Africa. It grows in rocky terrain, often in crevices from elevations of 500 to 2,000 meters (1,600 to 6,600 ft).

The plant measures between 10 and 30 centimeters (3.9 and 11.8 in) with woody stems. It flowers from June to September, with flowers 1 to 2.2 centimeters across.
