= Marsh gentian =

Marsh gentian is a common name for several plants and may refer to:

- Gentiana affinis, native to western North America
- Gentiana pneumonanthe, native to Europe
