= Yellow thistle =

Yellow thistle is a common name for several plants and may refer to:

- Argemone mexicana, native to Mexico
- Cirsium erisithales, native to southern and eastern Europe
- Cirsium horridulum, native to the United States
