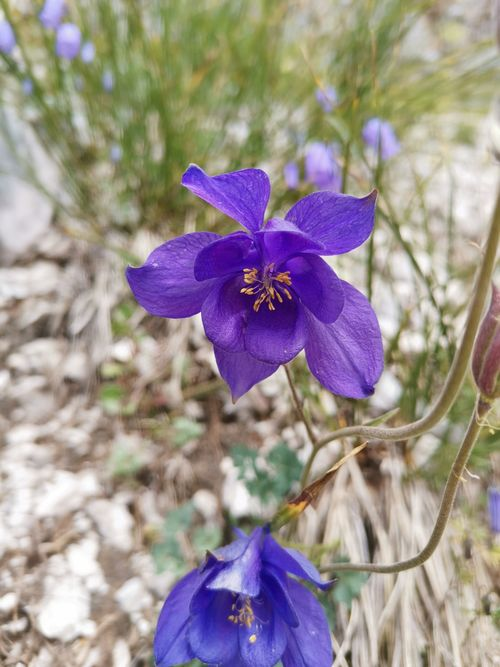
- Flower

Scientific classification
- Kingdom: Plantae
- Clade: Tracheophytes
- Clade: Angiosperms
- Clade: Eudicots
- Order: Ranunculales
- Family: Ranunculaceae
- Genus: Aquilegia
- Species: A. iulia

Binomial name
- Aquilegia iulia E.Nardi

= Aquilegia iulia =

Species of flowering plant native to Slovenia

Aquilegia iulia, known as the Julian columbine, is a perennial flowering plant in the family Ranunculaceae, endemic to Slovenia.

== Description ==
Aquilegia iulia is a perennial herbaceous plant with smooth or sparsely hairy and leafy stems. The leaves are smooth, long-stalked, and ternate or biternate. The flowers are either solitary or form bract-like inflorescences, and are large (up to 66 mm (2.6 in) across) and blue-violet. The sepals are egg-shaped or pointed oval-shaped, up to 33 mm (1.3 in) long and 18 mm (0.7 in) wide, and downy on the undersides and edges. The petals of the primary flowers are the same size as the sepals, while the nectar spurs are shorter and straight or slightly curved. The stamens do not protrude beyond the petals, and form a spread-out shape. The anthers are yellow and the follicles are small.

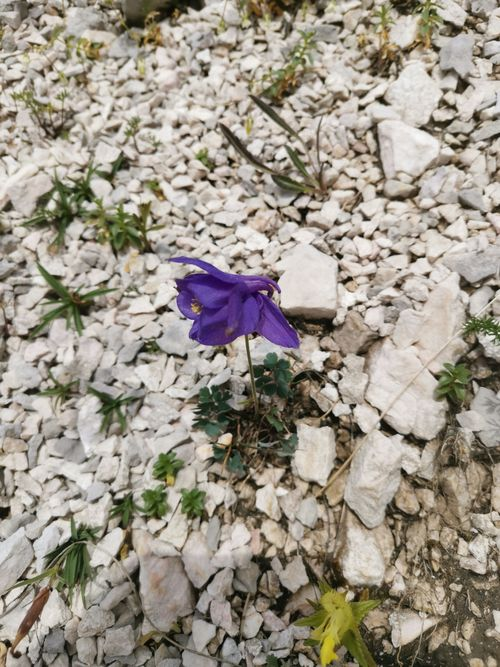
Aquilegia iulia growing in scree

== Taxonomy ==
Aquilegia iulia belongs to a clade containing most of the European columbine species, which appear to have diverged from their closest relatives in Asia in the early Pleistocene, a little over 2 million years ago. It is most closely related to Aquilegia einseleana, from which it is distinguished by its larger flowers, longer and broader sepals, and larger petals that are longer than the nectar spurs; and to Aquilegia kitaibelii, differentiated by its smoother stems and leaves, slightly larger flowers, and longer and broader sepals. It can be distinguished from Aquilegia bertolonii by its larger flowers and longer and broader sepals, and by its petals being longer than the nectar spurs.

=== Taxonomic history ===
The type specimen, identified at the time as A. kitaibelii, was collected in August 1920 in the Julian Alps by the Austrian-Italian botanist Carlo de Marchesetti. It was described as a separate species in its own right by the Italian botanist Enio Nardi in 2011.

=== Etymology ===
The specific epithet iulia comes from the Latin name Iuliae Alpes of the Julian Alps, to which the species is native.

== Distribution and habitat ==
Aquilegia iulia is endemic to the Julian Alps in northwestern Slovenia, growing on a wide ridge east of the mountain Krn and on the Trnovo Forest Plateau. It grows on calcareous rocky slopes and rock crevices at altitudes of 400–1,350 m (1,310–4,430 ft). It is also found in black pine and Scots pine forests, larch forests, beech forests, alpine meadows, and occasionally in gravel river beds of the Trebušica and Belca rivers.

== Conservation ==
As of May 2025, the species has not been assessed for the IUCN Red List. However, it is considered a species of conservation concern in Slovenia. Current threats include the conversion of the species' gravelly soil habitats to pastureland.

== Ecology ==
Aquilegia iulia is a diagnostic species for the following plant communities:

- Thlaspietea rotundifolii, along with the limestone fern Gymnocarpium robertianum, Adenostyles glabra, and hawkweed Hieracium bifidum
- Primulo carniolicae-Potentilletum clusianae, along with the cinquefoil Potentilla clusiana, Carniolan primrose Primula carniolica, Carex firma sedge, earleaf bellflower Campanula cochleariifolia, Rhodothamnus chamaecistus, Hladnikia pastinacifolia, and hawkweed Hieracium pillosum

It is also found in the Amelanchiero ovalis-Pinetum mugo dwarf mountain pine scrub plant community, where it grows in association with round-leaved wintergreen Pyrola rotundifolia, bitter willow Salix eleagnos, carniolan masterwort Astrantia carniolica, Trisetum argenteum oatgrass, Zois' bellflower Campanula zoysii and the lady's-slipper orchid Cypripedium calceolus.

Hybrid specimens transitional between A. iulia and A. einseleana have been observed in gravel river beds, an occasional habitat of both species.
