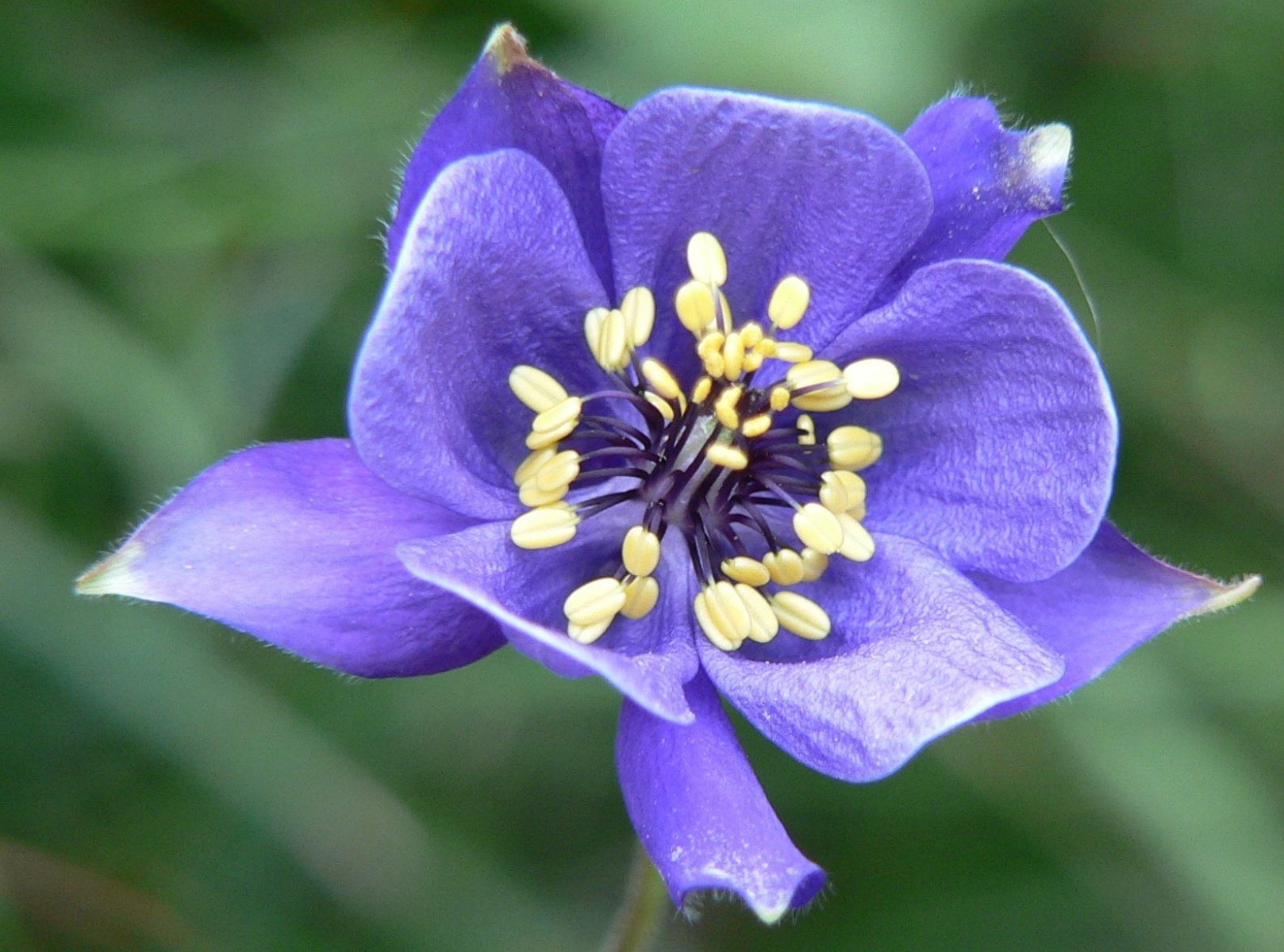

Scientific classification
- Kingdom: Plantae
- Clade: Tracheophytes
- Clade: Angiosperms
- Clade: Eudicots
- Order: Ranunculales
- Family: Ranunculaceae
- Genus: Aquilegia
- Species: A. confusa

Binomial name
- Aquilegia confusa Rota, Prosp. Fl. Bergamo: 99 (1853)

Synonyms
- List: Homotypic synonyms; Aquilegia pyrenaica f. confusa (Rota) Fiori; Heterotypic synonyms; Aquilegia benacensis Boothman; Aquilegia einseleana f. cimarollii Pamp.; Aquilegia einseleana f. intermedia Pamp.; Aquilegia einseleana var. portae (Huter) Gürke; Aquilegia einseleana proles portae (Huter) Graebn. & P.Graebn.; Aquilegia einseleana f. reichenbachii Pamp.; Aquilegia einseleana f. schleicheri Skalińska; Aquilegia portae Huter; Aquilegia pyrenaica f. portae (Huter) Fiori

= Aquilegia confusa =

Species of flowering plant

Aquilegia confusa is a partially accepted species of flowering plant of the genus Aquilegia (columbines) in the family Ranunculaceae that is endemic to the eastern and southern European Alps in Switzerland and Italy.

Growing between 8 cm (3.1 in) and 57 cm (22 in) tall, A. confusa produces fragrant violet flowers between June and September. The entirety of the plant, particularly its seeds, are toxic to humans.

The species likely radiated out from the Balkans, part of a larger group of Aquilegia that expanded into the Central Alps. As a result of the expanding and contracting of glaciers isolating populations of the species, A. confusa has two distinct forms. In the western higher-elevation populations, the species has adapted to better survive in open sunshine and have lower genetic diversity within individual populations. In eastern population, the species is better adapted to lower, shadier elevations and greater competition for pollinators.

Some taxonomic authorities consider A. confusa synonymous with the more prevalent Aquilegia einseleana, with the two having ranges that overlap. A. eisenleana and Aquilegia atrata both hybridize with A. confusa.

== Description ==
Aquilegia confusa is a flowering perennial herbaceous plant in the genus Aquilegia in the family Ranunculaceae. The species possesses rootstocks that can be simple or branching. During its annual growth, the plant will project between one and four flowering stems. Aerial stems are slender and range in height between 8 cm (3.1 in) and 57 cm (22 in) tall. The stems are usually covered by a mix of glandular-pubescent simple hairs and glandular trichomes, with the trichomes becoming the predominant to exclusive hairs towards to top of the stem. Lower stems are rarely glabrous (hairless), with exceptional specimens being entirely glabrous.

The plant's numerous basal leaves (leaves from the base of the plant) are arranged in a rosette. The largest leaves on a plant can range from 5 cm (2.0 in) to 24 cm (9.4 in) long. The petioles are long, at between 3 cm (1.2 in) and 17 cm (6.7 in). The ternate leaf sets appear either singly or as pairs. The leaf blades' topsides can be glabrous or somewhat pubescent, while the bottoms are glaucous (grey and waxy) and range from sparsely pubescent to wholly glabrous. The first-order leaflets are borne on petioles between 5 mm (0.20 in) and 45 mm (1.8 in) and appear as a single ternate set or as a single leaf with three-division compound leaf. On some plants, second-order leaflets are present. These are sessile (not attached directly to the stem rather than by a petiole) or borne on short petioles of up to 5 mm (0.20 in) long. Cauline leaves (leaves attached to the aerial stem), if present, number up to four and are attached with petioles between 0.3 cm (0.12 in) and 7 cm (2.8 in) long. The cauline leaves are otherwise similar to the basal leaves.

The plant's flowering period is between June and September, occasionally into October, in its native range. The inflorescences (grouping of flowers on stem) feature bract leaves, with inflorescences branching from the lower stem rarely presenting with fronds. The bracts are lanceolate or linear in shape to an acute end and are usually glandular. The peduncle (stalk supporting the inflorescence) is usually glandular, though it is occasionally glabrous. Each inflorescence possesses between one and seven flowers.

The flowers on this species are violet, fragrant, and relatively small, ranging between 20 mm (0.79 in) and 54 mm (2.1 in) in diameter. The five sepals are ovate-lanceolate or ovate in shape, coming to an acute end. Each sepal is 10 mm (0.39 in) to 27 mm (1.1 in) wide and 5 mm (0.20 in) to 12 mm (0.47 in) long. The five petals are also relatively short at between 13 mm (0.51 in) and 28 mm (1.1 in) in length. The petals' limbs are longer than the nectar spurs, with dimensions of between 9 mm (0.35 in) and 16 mm (0.63 in) wide and 6 mm (0.24 in) and 13 mm (0.51 in) long. These limbs are oblong-elliptic or obovate in shape and come to rounded or rounded-truncate ends. Each flower's petals form a heterogenous funnel shape, with the upper portion of this arrangement radiating out to a diameter of 18 mm (0.71 in) to 28 mm (1.1 in).

The nectar spurs are relatively uniform on a flower, featuring a obconical or trumpet shape. They can be straight or slightly curve along their 4 mm (0.16 in) to 12 mm (0.47 in) length. The spurs' throats can range between 3 mm (0.12 in) and 5 mm (0.20 in) wide. The staminal column is shorter than the limbs, measuring between 6 mm (0.24 in) and 12 mm (0.47 in) long. Filaments, ranging from tinged violet to violet, connect to yellow anthers. Lanceolate staminodes are present, measuring 5 mm (0.20 in) to 7 mm (0.28 in) wide and 1 mm (0.039 in) to 1.5 mm (0.059 in). The small follicles are possess strong transverse veins.

The plant as a whole is toxic, with the seeds being particularly dangerous to human consumption due to cardiac glycosides.

== Ecology ==
Due to the isolated character of Aquilegia confusa populations – the result of glaciers expanding and contracting – the species has distinctly sciophilous (shade-tolerant) and heliophilous (sun-tolerant) forms that favor the lower and upper elevation brackets respectively. In the species's eastern range, the species features glandular leaves. These glands are associated with smells that attract pollinators in environments that are more competitive as well as shaded, secluded locales. This eastern range coincides with the A. confusa's range overlapping with the more common Aquilegia einseleana.

The absence of glandular leaves on A. confusa increases going west through its prealpine range until they disappear entirely, where the species not competing with A. eiseleana. The presence of fewer pollinators have resulted in lower genetic diversity within these higher-elevation A. confusa populations. Combined with the plant's capacity for self-fertilization, this has resulted in substantial phenotype differences between individual populations.

In the eastern range of A. confusa, its physiognomical distinctiveness from A. eiseleana is reduced, with hybridization not uncommon. Aquilegia atrata's range also overlaps with that of A. confusa. Despite having different in flowering seasons and other ecological distinctions, hybridization between the two has also been observed. The resulting hybrids range in physical appearance from wholly mirroring one progenitor to varied features reflecting aspects of both.

== Taxonomy ==
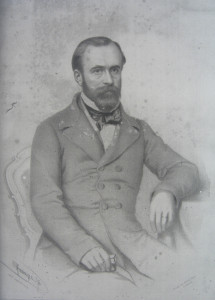
Lorenzo Rota (pictured) was the first to describe Aquilegia confusa.

Aquilegia confusa was first described with its binomial in 1853 by Lorenzo Rota.

Philip A. Munz's 1946 monograph Aquilegia: The Cultivated and Wild Columbines is considered the principal authority on the genus Aquilegia. Munz recognized 67 species, with later authorities on Aquilegia showing little consensus regarding the number of species, subspecies, and varieties. Munz considered the plant a taxonomic synonym for the species Aquilegia einseleana, . The Global Biodiversity Information Facility, an international organization that provides open-access data on plants, recognizes A. confusa as a synonym for A. einseleana.

Historically, this treatment of A. confusa as unified with A. einseleana has been the majority perspective of authorities. However, in 2015, Italian botanist Enio Nardi noted that the morphological similarities, particularly in dried herbarium specimens, leading to this classification ignoring differences in habitat. Nardi identified the Croatian species Aquilegia kitaibelii as especially morphologically similar to A. confusa, with A. confusa likely originating out of the Balkans. Despite specimens of A. confusa being almost indistinguishable from those of A. kitaibelii, Nardi said the lack of evidence tying the two meant that A. confusa is the correct name for the plants of that appearance in Italy.

The species A. confusa is accepted by other authorities. The Royal Botanic Gardens, Kew follows Nardi in his recognition of the species. Nardi specified the species's lectotype within the same book.

=== Name ===
The word columbine derives from the Latin word columba, meaning "dove", a reference to the flowers' appearance of a group of doves. The genus name Aquilegia may come from the Latin word for "eagle", aquila, in reference to the petals' resemblance to eagle talons. The specific name confusa means "confused" or "uncertain". The Italian common name for the species is the same as its taxonomic name.

== Distribution and habitat ==
Aquilegia confusa is a perennial that favors temperate environments, inhabiting the southern prealpine zone. A. confusa is endemic to the eastern and southern European Alps in Switzerland and Italy. In Italy, it is specifically endemic from Lombardy to Friuli. The distribution is coincident with ancient glacial shelters.

This range developed during the advance of the Quaternary glaciations. As these glaciers eroded A. confusa's range and pushed its populations against the larger populations of A. eiseleana, degrading the physiognomical distinctiveness of eastern A. confusa populations. The glaciations also isolated A. confusa populations, with some surviving at the lower elevations at the margins of glaciers while others held out at higher elevations on mountains ringed by glaciers. This pressure is credited with A. confusa containing both sciophilous and heliophilous populations.

A. confusa can be found at elevations between 350 m (1,150 ft) and 2,200 m (7,200 ft) above sea level. It prefers rocky environments within its range, including rocky pastures, screes, and riverbeds. The plant favors damp, rocky soil, particularly those comprising calcareous or dolomitic substrates. The species occasionally occupies granitic or gneissic soil.
