= Great masterwort =

Great masterwort is the common name of several flowering plants in the genus Astrantia, including:

- Astrantia maxima ("largest"), with pinkish-white flowers
- Astrantia major ("larger"), with greenish-white flowers with reddish shades

== See also ==
- Peucedanum ostruthium or Imperatoria ostruthium, commonly known as masterwort.
