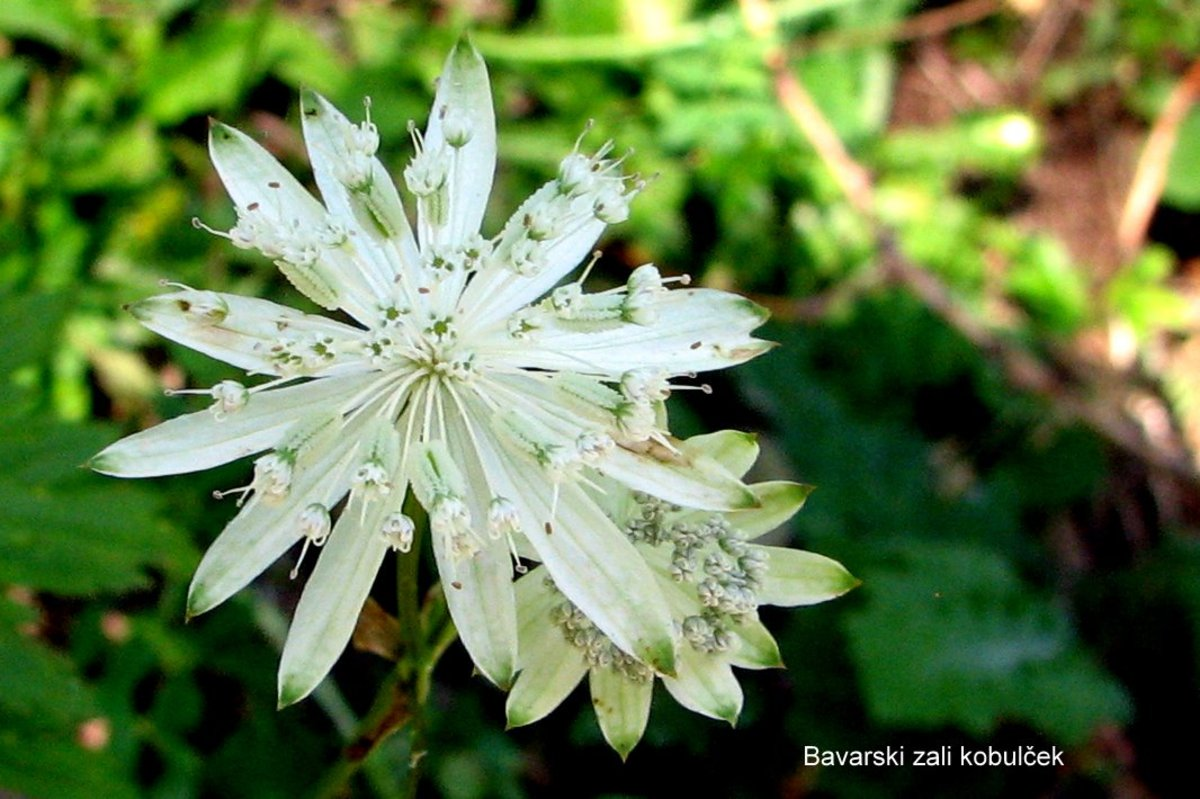

Scientific classification
- Kingdom: Plantae
- Clade: Tracheophytes
- Clade: Angiosperms
- Clade: Eudicots
- Clade: Asterids
- Order: Apiales
- Family: Apiaceae
- Genus: Astrantia
- Species: A. bavarica

Binomial name
- Astrantia bavarica L.

Synonyms
- Sanicula bavarica (F.W.Schultz) E.H.L.Krause; Astrantia alpina Stur ex Nyman; Astrantia carniolica W.D.J.Koch, sensu auct.; Astrantia dondiifolia Schur; Astrantia gracilis Bartl.; Astrantia microphylla Schur

= Astrantia bavarica =

Species of plant

Astrantia bavarica, common name masterwort, is a species of flowering plant in the family Apiaceae, native to Eastern alps. Growing to 30 cm (12 in) tall by 30 cm (12 in) broad, it is an herbaceous perennial, much used in gardens.

== Etymology ==
The specific epithet bavarica, meaning "from bavaria". Bavaria is a state in Germany, which geographically distinguishes this species from its smaller relative Astrantia minor and from its larger relatives Astrantia major and Astrantia maxima. Astrantia bavarica was described by Friedrich Wilhelm Schultz in 1858, and published in Flora Vol.41 (issue 11) on page 161.

== Description ==
Astrantia bavarica reaches on average 30 centimetres (12 in) of height. The stem is erect and glabrous, with little branches and few leaves. The basal leaves have a long petiole 10–20 centimetres (3.9–7.9 in), 3 to 7 lobes and toothed segments. Size: 8–15 centimetres (3.1–5.9 in). The cauline leaves are generally two, sessile, amplexicaul and lanceolate-shaped with a trilobed apex. The inflorescence is umbrella-shaped, with 2–3 centimetres (0.79–1.18 in) of diameter. The floral bracts are numerous (10 - 20), 10–18 millimetres (0.39–0.71 in) long, greenish-white with acuminate apex. The small flowers are greenish-white (with pink undertones). The central ones are hermaphrodite, while the external ones are male. The flowering period extends from April through to November. It has a RHS Hardiness Rating: H7.

== Reproduction ==
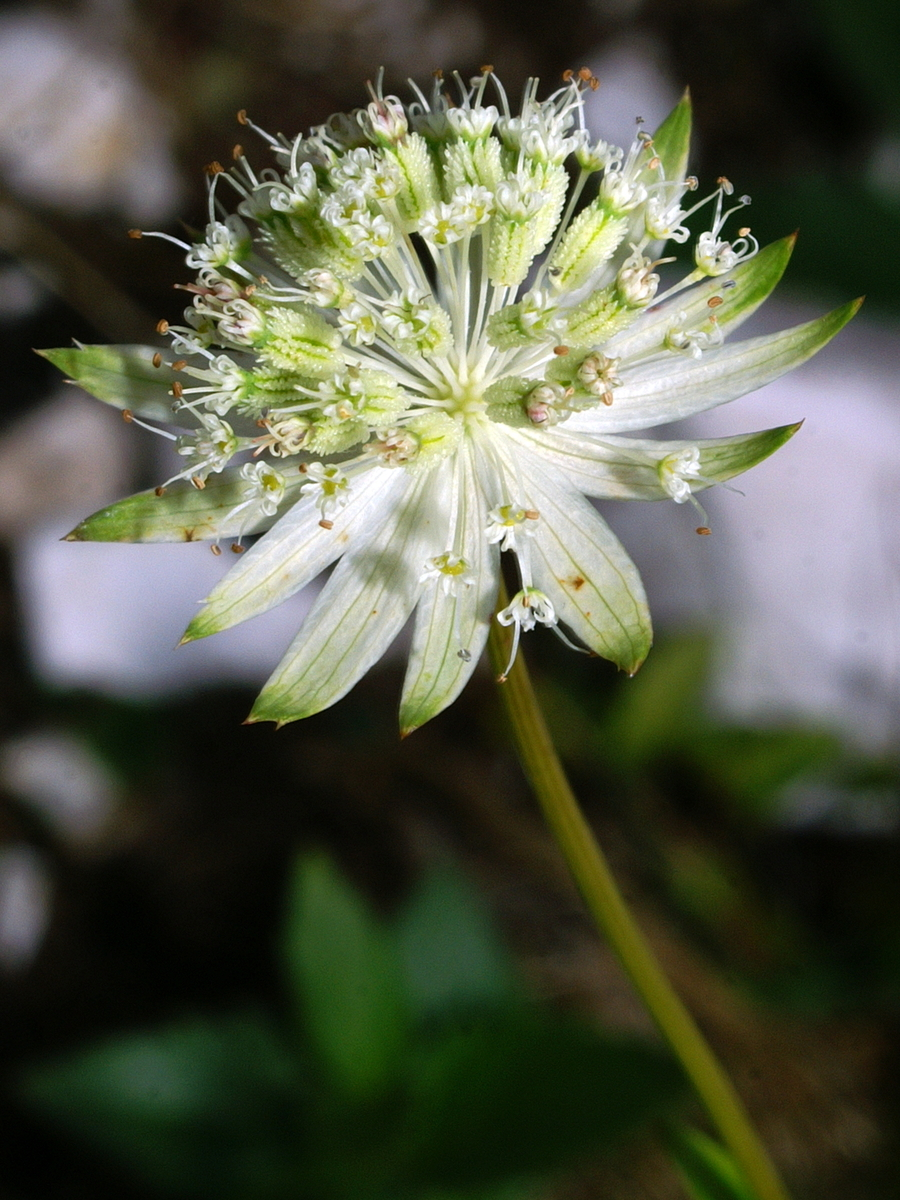
Astrantia bavarica, in Pod Rjavino, Slovenia

Astrantia bavarica is an entomophilous plant, mainly pollinated by beetles, but also by other insects. This perennial plant reproduces itself also by means of buds present at the ground level. It can also be grown from seed as well.

== Distribution and habitat ==
Astrantia bavarica is native to Europe, and found within Germany, Italy, Austria, Slovenia, and the eastern Alps. They are common in mountain woodlands and scrubland, clearings and close to the streams, usually on calcareous soils, at an altitude of 2,300 metres (7,500 ft) above sea level.
