= Masterwort =

Masterwort is a common name for several plants in the family Apiaceae and may refer to:

- Astrantia, a genus with several plant species cultivated as ornamentals
- Heracleum, a genus of plants known for their phototoxic effects
- Peucedanum ostruthium, a species used as an herbal flavoring
- Aegopodium podagraria, a species that is sometimes called English masterwort or wild masterwort
Plants called masterwort
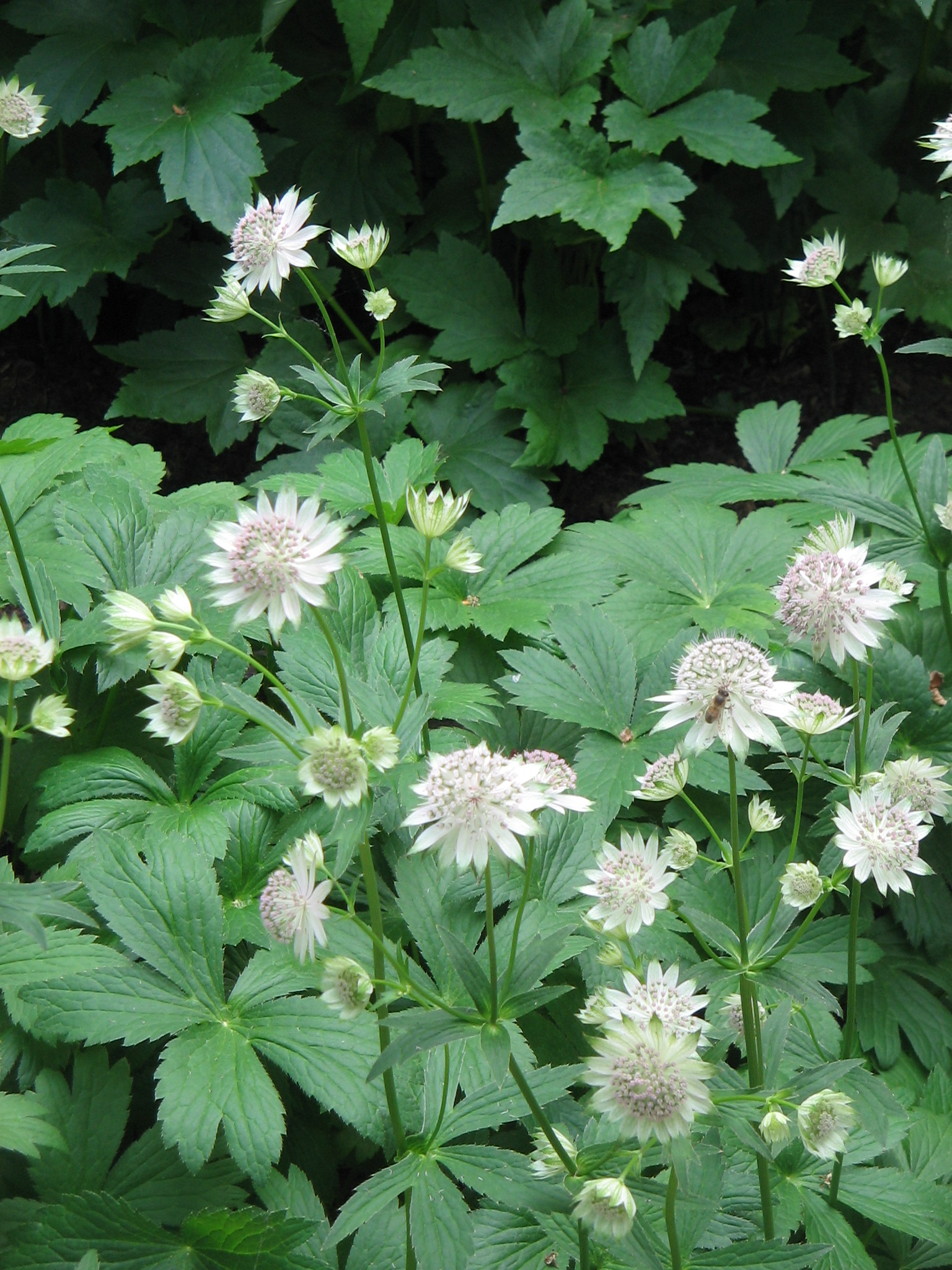
Astrantia major

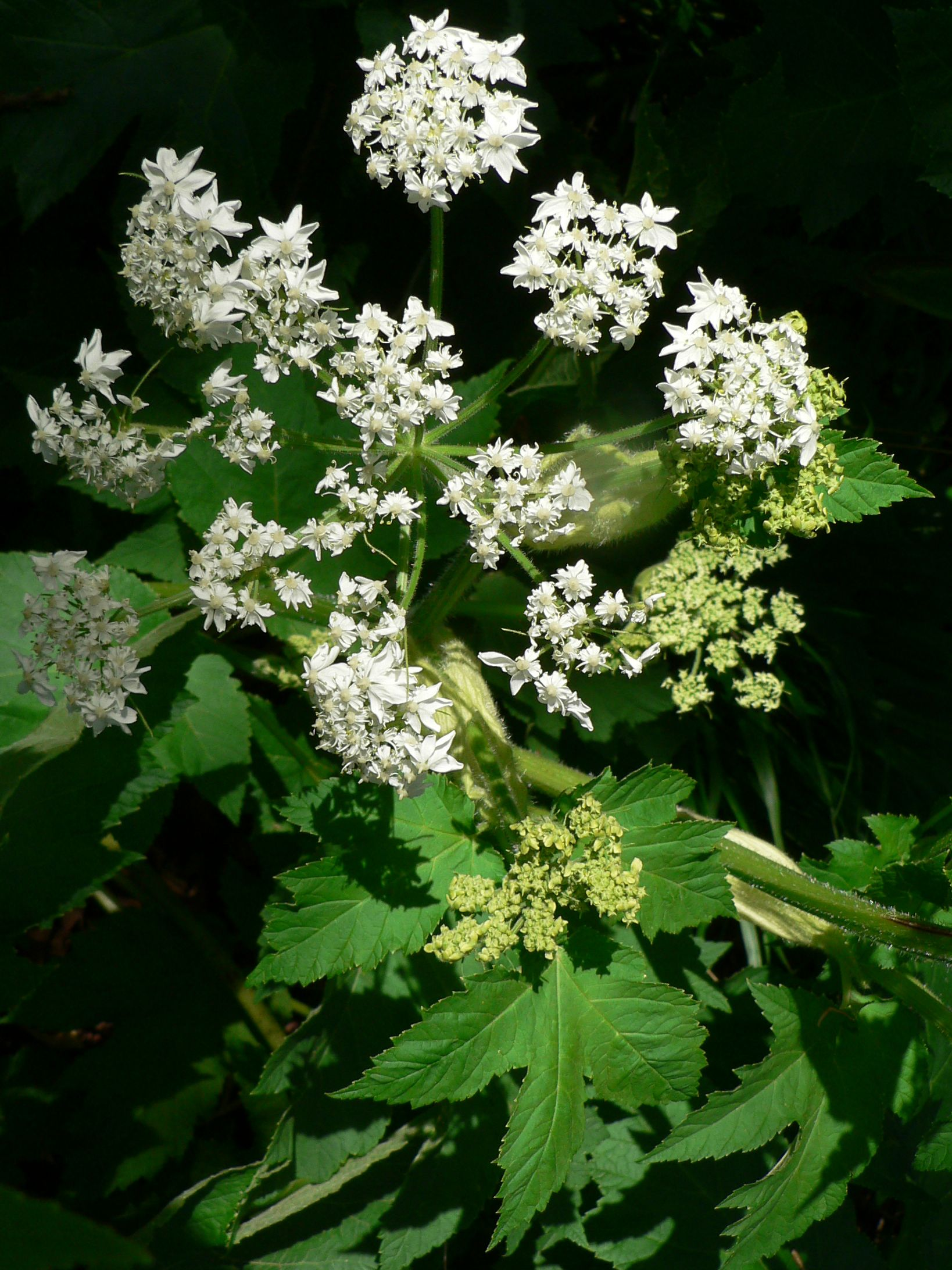
Heracleum lanatum

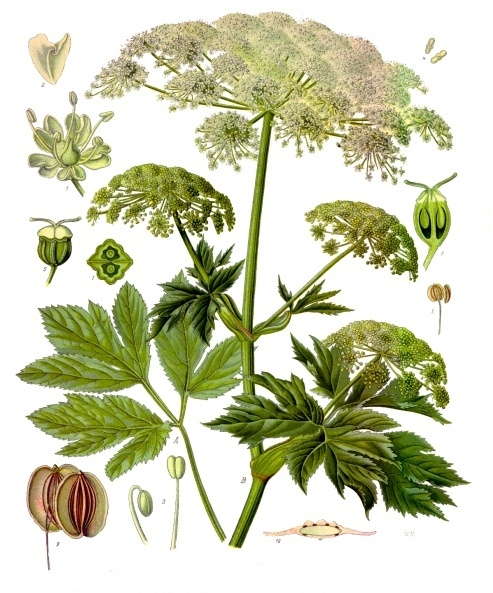
Drawing of Peucedanum ostruthium
