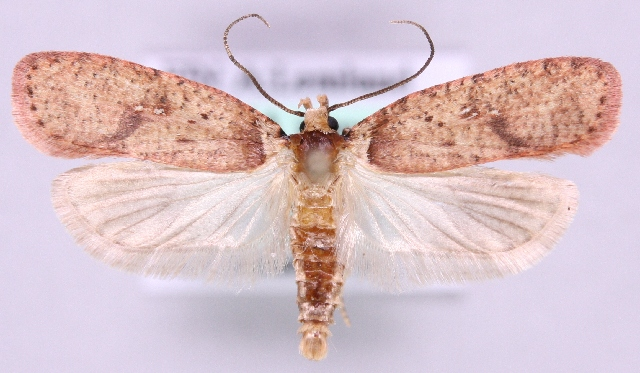

Scientific classification
- Kingdom: Animalia
- Phylum: Arthropoda
- Clade: Pancrustacea
- Class: Insecta
- Order: Lepidoptera
- Family: Depressariidae
- Genus: Agonopterix
- Species: A. astrantiae

Binomial name
- Agonopterix astrantiae (Heinemann, 1870)

Synonyms
- Depressaria astrantiae Heinemann, 1870; Depressaria isabellina Klemensiewicz, 1898

= Agonopterix astrantiae =

Species of moth

Agonopterix astrantiae is a moth of the family Depressariidae. It is found in most of Europe, except the Iberian Peninsula, most of the Balkan Peninsula and the Benelux.

The wingspan is 19–22 mm. Adults have been recorded in May.

The larvae feed on Sanicula europaea and Astrantia major. They create a leaf spinning from which they feed.
