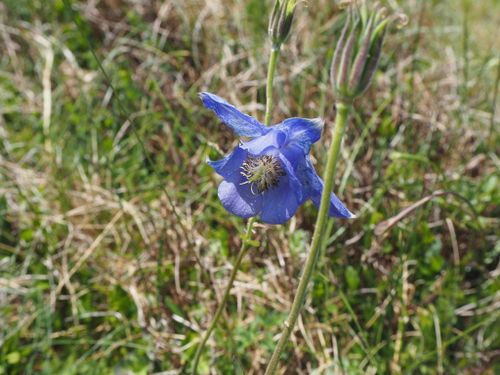
- Aquilegia lucensis in flower

Scientific classification
- Kingdom: Plantae
- Clade: Tracheophytes
- Clade: Angiosperms
- Clade: Eudicots
- Order: Ranunculales
- Family: Ranunculaceae
- Genus: Aquilegia
- Species: A. lucensis

Binomial name
- Aquilegia lucensis E.Nardi

Synonyms
- Isopyrum thalictroides var. insigne Gibelli & Pirotta

= Aquilegia lucensis =

Species of flowering plant

Aquilegia lucensis is a perennial flowering plant in the family Ranunculaceae, endemic to Italy.

== Description ==
Aquilegia lucensis is a perennial herbaceous plant with smooth or sparsely hairy and leafy stems. The leaves are smooth on the upperside, sparsely hairy underneath, long-stalked, and biternate. The flowers are either solitary or form bract-like inflorescences of a few flowers, and are open, large (up to 90 mm (3.5 in) across), blue-violet, and sweet-smelling. The sepals are egg-shaped or oval, up to 45 mm (1.8 in) long and 30 mm (1.2 in) wide, and slightly downy. The petals are downy and truncated, up to 45 mm (1.8 in) long, with nectar spurs that are usually somewhat longer than the petal. The stamens do not protrude beyond the petals, and form a spread-out shape. The anthers are pointed and blackish, the staminodes pointed, the styles smooth towards the top, and the follicles are large at up to 27 mm (1.1 in) long.

== Taxonomy ==
The species is similar to Aquilegia alpina, from which it is distinguished by its wider and more oval sepals, more varied nectar spurs, and smooth styles; and to Aquilegia bertolonii, differing in its narrower leaf blades, larger flowers, more oval sepals, more varied nectar spurs, blackish anthers, and larger stamens.

=== Taxonomic history ===
The type specimen was collected on 5 July 1974 by the Italian botanists Enio Nardi and Marcello Tardelli, on the northeastern slopes near the summit of the mountain Alpe Tre Potenze at an altitude around 1,700–1,740 m (5,580–5,710 ft). It was described as a new species by Nardi in 2011, in the same paper as Aquilegia iulia.

The plant had previously been described in 1882 as a variety insigne of Isopyrum thalictroides, by the Italian botanists Giuseppe Gibelli and Pietro Romualdo Pirotta.

=== Etymology ===
The specific epithet lucensis means "of Lucca" in Latin, from the historical Republic of Lucca. The species grows in the northern part of the republic's former territory.

== Distribution and habitat ==
Aquilegia lucensis is endemic to northern Italy, growing in the Apennines in Tuscany, Liguria, and Emilia Romagna, where it is the only Aquilegia species found. It grows in mountain habitats at altitudes of 1,530–1,980 m (5,020–6,500 ft).

== Conservation ==
As of May 2025, the species has not been assessed for the IUCN Red List. In Italy it is considered Near Threatened (NT) and listed as a protected species, but is threatened by flower collection and the destruction of grasslands by the construction of roads and skiing facilities.

== Ecology ==
Aquilegia lucensis flowers from April to July.

It is a diagnostic species for the plant community Aquilegio lucensis-Anemonastretum narcissiflorae in the Tuscan-Emilian Apennines, along with the narcissus anemone Anemonastrum narcissiflorum, lady's mantle Alchemilla xanthochlora, alpine flax Linum alpinum, alpine pasqueflower Pulsatilla alpina subsp. millefoliata, and shining scabious Scabiosa lucida. This plant community forms dense, species-rich swards of 5–10 m^{2} (54–108 sq ft) on calcium-rich northern slopes at altitudes of 1,530–1,980 m (5,020–6,500 ft).
