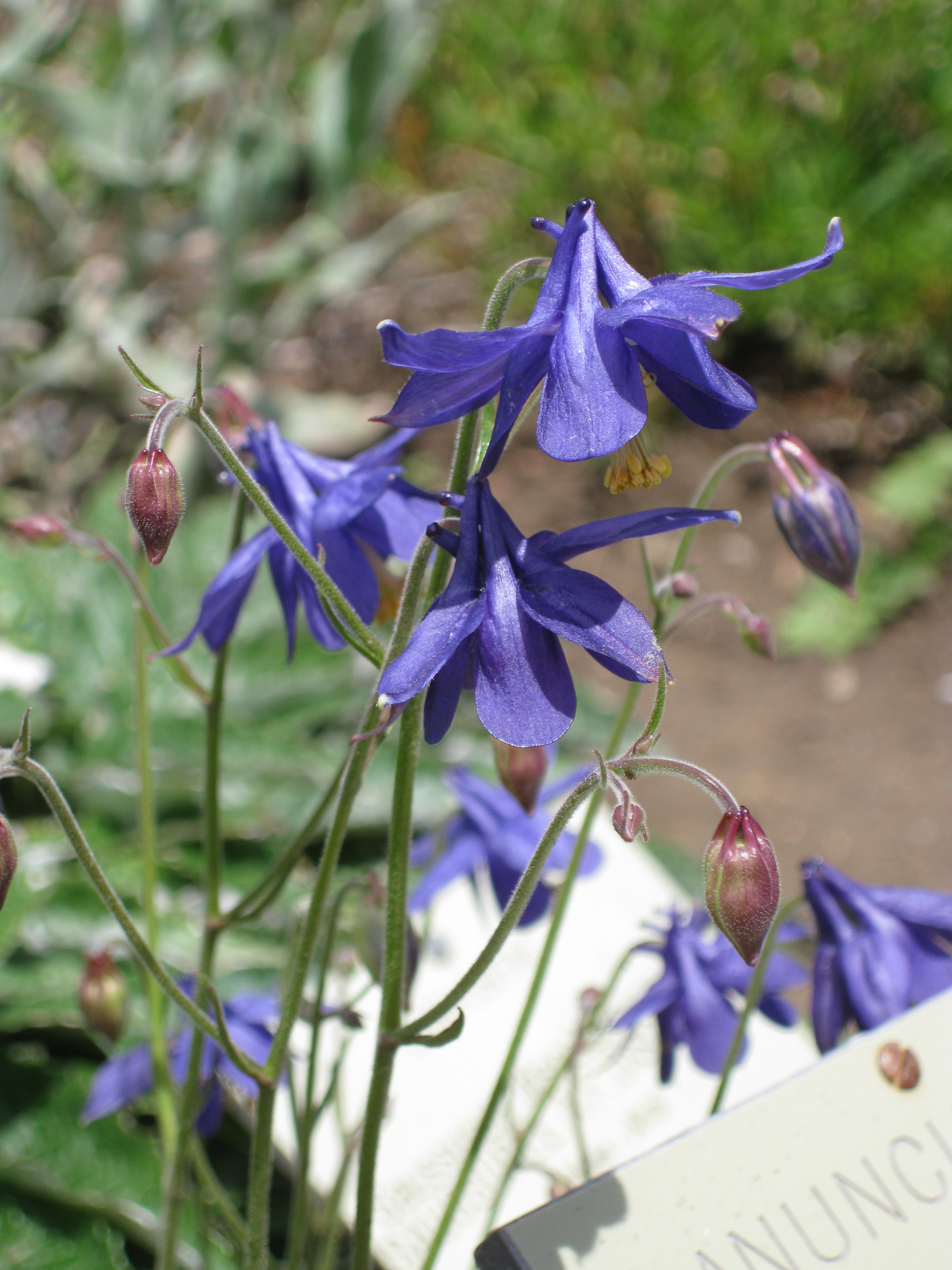
- Flower

Conservation status
- Not evaluated (IUCN 3.1)

Scientific classification
- Kingdom: Plantae
- Clade: Tracheophytes
- Clade: Angiosperms
- Clade: Eudicots
- Order: Ranunculales
- Family: Ranunculaceae
- Genus: Aquilegia
- Species: A. einseleana

Binomial name
- Aquilegia einseleana F.W.Schultz

Synonyms
- List: Aquilegia facchinii Schott ex Arcang.; Aquilegia pyrenaica var. einseleana (F.W.Schultz) F.W.Schultz; Aquilegia vulgaris var. einseleana (F.W.Schultz) Brühl; Aquilegia bauhini Schott; Aquilegia bauhini subsp. thalictrifolia (Schott & Kotschy) Nyman; Aquilegia bauhini var. thalictrifolia (Schott & Kotschy) F.W.Schultz ex Ces., Pass. & Gibelli; Aquilegia einseleana var. bauhini (Schott) Rapaics; Aquilegia einseleana f. intercedens Pamp.; Aquilegia einseleana subf. longiuscula F.Beer ex Dalla Torre; Aquilegia einseleana var. thalictrifolia (Schott & Kotschy) Rapaics; Aquilegia einseleana f. thalictrifolia (Schott & Kotschy) Skalińska; Aquilegia facchinii var. thalictrifolia (Schott & Kotschy) F.W.Schultz ex Arcang.; Aquilegia pyrenaica W.D.J.Koch; Aquilegia pyrenaica f. thalictrifolia (Schott & Kotschy) Fiori; Aquilegia pyrenaica var. thalictrifolia (Schott & Kotschy) Fiori & Paol.; Aquilegia thalictrifolia Schott & Kotschy; Aquilegia thalictrifolia f. cimarollii Pamp.; Aquilegia thalictrifolia f. interceden (Pamp.) F.Beer ex Dalla Torre; Aquilegia thalictrifolia f. intermedia Pamp.; Aquilegia vestinae Pfenn. & D.M.Moser; Aquilegia viscosa Rchb.; Aquilegia vulgaris var. thalictrifolia (Schott & Kotschy) Brühl

= Aquilegia einseleana =

Alpine species of columbine

Aquilegia einseleana, or Einsele's columbine, is a perennial species of plant in the family Ranunculaceae, native to the eastern Alps.

== Description ==
Aquilegia einseleana grows to 15–40 cm (5.9–15.7 in) in height. It has 1–3 (rarely up to 6) nodding blue-violet flowers of 2.5–4.0 cm (0.98–1.57 in) in diameter, with straight or slightly incurved spurs of around 9 mm (0.35 in).

== Taxonomy ==
Aquilegia einseleana is most closely related to Aquilegia bertolonii, Bertoloni's columbine. The two species are estimated to have diverged from each other in the Pliocene around 1.23 million years ago, and form a sister clade to one containing the other European and some North and East Asian species of Aquilegia, from which they diverged approximately 2.5 million years ago.

=== Etymology ===
The species was described by the German botanist Friedrich Wilhelm Schultz (1804–1876) in 1848, and named after his friend Dr. August Max Einsele (1803–1870), a Bavarian physician and botanist.

== Distribution and habitat ==
Aquilegia einseleana is native to the central and eastern Alps of Slovenia, Bavaria in Germany, Friuli-Venezia Giulia, Lombardy, Trentino-Alto Adige/Südtirol, and Veneto in Italy, and Austria. It grows in grassy and rocky limestone areas at altitudes of 600–1,800 m (2,000–5,900 ft), in the montane to subalpine zones.

== Ecology ==
Aquilegia einseleana flowers from June to July and is pollinated by bumblebees.

== Conservation ==
The species has not been assessed for the IUCN Red List. In Switzerland, it is considered vulnerable in certain regions, and is fully protected in the Canton of Ticino.
