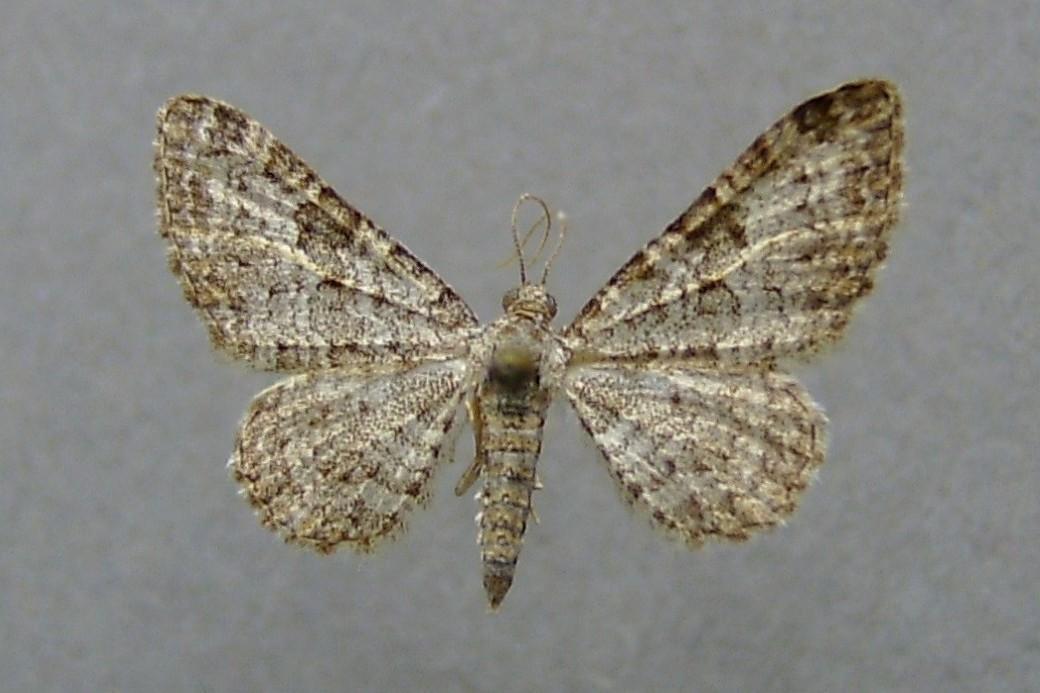

Scientific classification
- Domain: Eukaryota
- Kingdom: Animalia
- Phylum: Arthropoda
- Class: Insecta
- Order: Lepidoptera
- Family: Geometridae
- Genus: Eupithecia
- Species: E. impurata

Binomial name
- Eupithecia impurata (Hübner, 1813)

Synonyms
- Geometra impurata Hübner, 1813; Geometra modicata Hubner, 1813; Larentia proluaria Freyer, 1852

= Eupithecia impurata =

Species of moth

Eupithecia impurata is a moth of the family Geometridae. It is found from the mountainous areas of western, eastern and southern Europe up to Western Asia.

The wingspan is 19–24 mm. Adults are on wing from May to August and again from September to October in two generations per year.

The larvae feed on the flowers and fruit of Campanula cespitosa, Campanula cochleariifolia and Campanula rotundifolia.

== Subspecies ==
- Eupithecia impurata impurata
- Eupithecia impurata badeniata Schutze, 1952
- Eupithecia impurata franconiata Schutze, 1956
- Eupithecia impurata germanicata Schutze, 1952
- Eupithecia impurata gremmingerata Schutze, 1952
- Eupithecia impurata langeata Schutze, 1952
- Eupithecia impurata thuringiata Schutze, 1956
- Eupithecia impurata westfalicata Weigt, 1982
