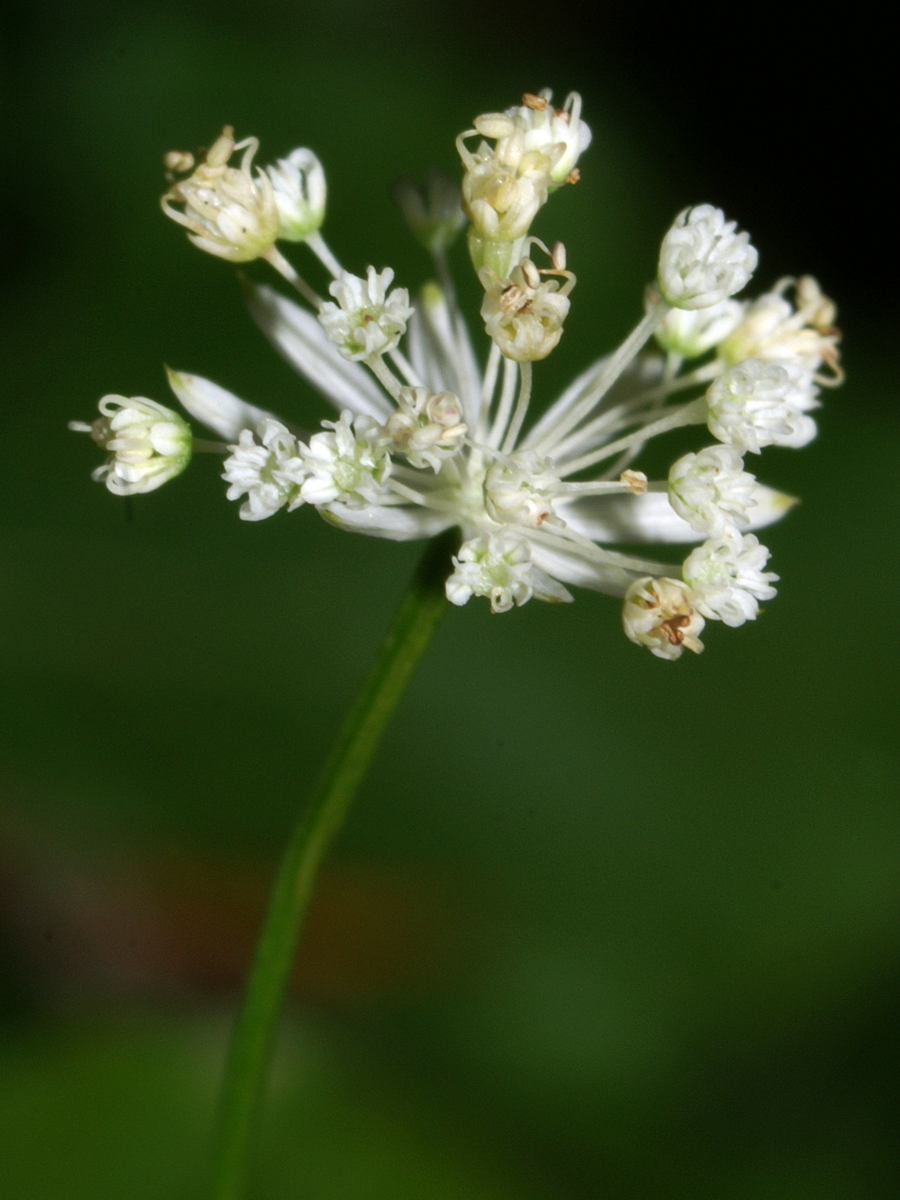

Scientific classification
- Kingdom: Plantae
- Clade: Tracheophytes
- Clade: Angiosperms
- Clade: Eudicots
- Clade: Asterids
- Order: Apiales
- Family: Apiaceae
- Genus: Astrantia
- Species: A. carniolica

Binomial name
- Astrantia carniolica Wulfen

Synonyms
- Astrantia gracilis Schur; Astrantia transsilvanica Schur; Etoxoe aromatica (Wulfen) Raf.

= Astrantia carniolica =

Species of plant

Astrantia carniolica, the carniolan masterwort or red masterwort, is a species of flowering plant in the family Apiaceae. It has long reddish (or white) flowers.

== Description ==
Astrantia carniolica reaches on average less than 45 centimetres (18 in) of height. The stem is erect and glabrous, with little branches and few leaves. The basal leaves have a long petiole 10–20 centimetres (3.9–7.9 in), 3 to 7 lobes and toothed segments. Size: 8–15 centimetres (3.1–5.9 in). The cauline leaves are generally two, sessile, amplexicaul and lanceolate-shaped with a trilobed apex. The inflorescence is umbrella-shaped, with 2–3 centimetres (0.79–1.18 in) of diameter. The floral bracts are numerous (10 - 20), 10–18 millimetres (0.39–0.71 in) long, reddish (sometimes white) with acuminate apex. The small flowers are white. The central ones are hermaphrodite, while the external ones are male. The petals are white, while the stamens are five and much longer. Size of the flowers: about 1–2 mm. The flowering period extends from June through September.

== Taxonomy ==
The specific epithet carniolica, meaning 'coming from Carniola'. Carniola was a historical region that comprised parts of present-day Slovenia. Which geographically distinguishes this species from its other relative Astrantia bavarica(from Germany).

Astrantia carniolica was originally described and published by Franz Xavier von Wulfen in 1778, in Volume 31 of 'Florae Austriacae, sive plantarum selectarum in Austriae archiducatu sponte crescentium, icones, ad vivum coloratae, et descriptionibus, ac synononymis illustratae.' (commonly known as Fl. Austriac. (Jacquin)).

It is sometimes known as the 'carnic masterwort', or 'Red Masterwort'.

Its Finnish common name is "Alppitähtiputki".

It was verified by United States Department of Agriculture and the Agricultural Research Service on 30 October 1996 and then updated on the 17 June 2008.

Astrantia carniolica is an accepted name by the RHS.

== Distribution and habitat ==
It is native to the south-eastern Alps in Europe.

== Range ==
It has been found in Austria, Bosnia and Herzegovina, Croatia, Italy and Slovenia.

In Slovenia, it has been found in the Julian Alps and near Bohinj lake.

== Habitat ==
They are common in mountain grasslands, in forests and clearings and close to the streams, usually on calcareous soils (limey soils), at an altitude of 1,500–1,600 metres (4,900–5,200 ft) above sea level.

== Cultivation ==
Astrantia carniolica also has one other cultivar recognised by the RHS. Astrantia carniolica 'rubra', which grows well in the garden, given some shade and moisture. Its flowerhead provides summer colour in shades of red. It is rated for hardiness, USDA zones 5 to 9.

== Reproduction ==
Astrantia carniolica is an entomophilous plant, mainly pollinated by beetles, but also by other insects. This perennial plant reproduces itself also by means of buds present at the ground level.

== Other sources ==
- Walter Erhardt, Erich Götz, Nils Bödeker, Siegmund Seybold: Der große Zander. Eugen Ulmer KG, Stuttgart 2008, ISBN 978-3-8001-5406-7. (Ger.)
- Christopher Brickell (Editor-in-chief): RHS A-Z Encyclopedia of Garden Plants. Third edition. Dorling Kindersley, London 2003, ISBN 0-7513-3738-2.
- Botanical Society of the British Isles. BSBI taxon database (on-line resource).
- Encke, F. et al. 1993. Zander: Handwörterbuch der Pflanzennamen, 14. Auflage.
- Huxley, A., ed. 1992. The new Royal Horticultural Society dictionary of gardening.
- Tutin, T. G. et al., eds. 1964–1980. Flora europaea
