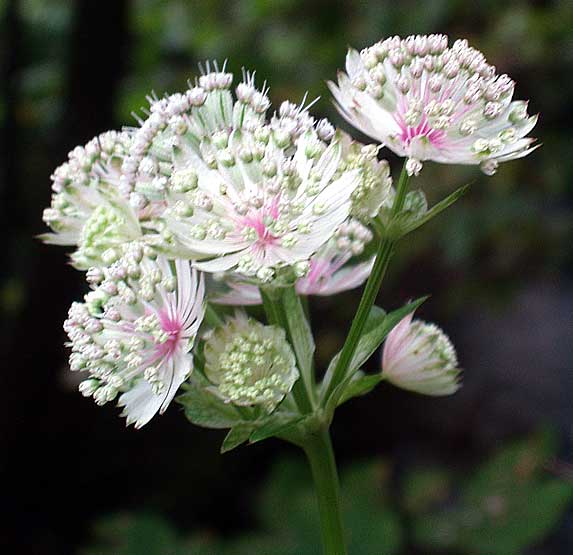
- Astrantia major

Scientific classification
- Kingdom: Plantae
- Clade: Embryophytes
- Clade: Tracheophytes
- Clade: Spermatophytes
- Clade: Angiosperms
- Clade: Eudicots
- Clade: Asterids
- Order: Apiales
- Family: Apiaceae
- Subfamily: Apioideae
- Tribe: Saniculeae
- Genus: Astrantia; L.

Species
- See text.

Synonyms
- Etoxoe Raf.; Transcaucasia M.Hiroe

= Astrantia =

Genus of flowering plants in the celery family

Astrantia is a genus of herbaceous plants in the family Apiaceae, native to Central, Eastern and Southern Europe and the Caucasus. There are several species, which have aromatic roots, palmate leaves, and decorative flowers. They are commonly known as great masterwort or masterwort which may also refer to other plants, particularly the unrelated Peucedanum ostruthium.

== Etymology ==
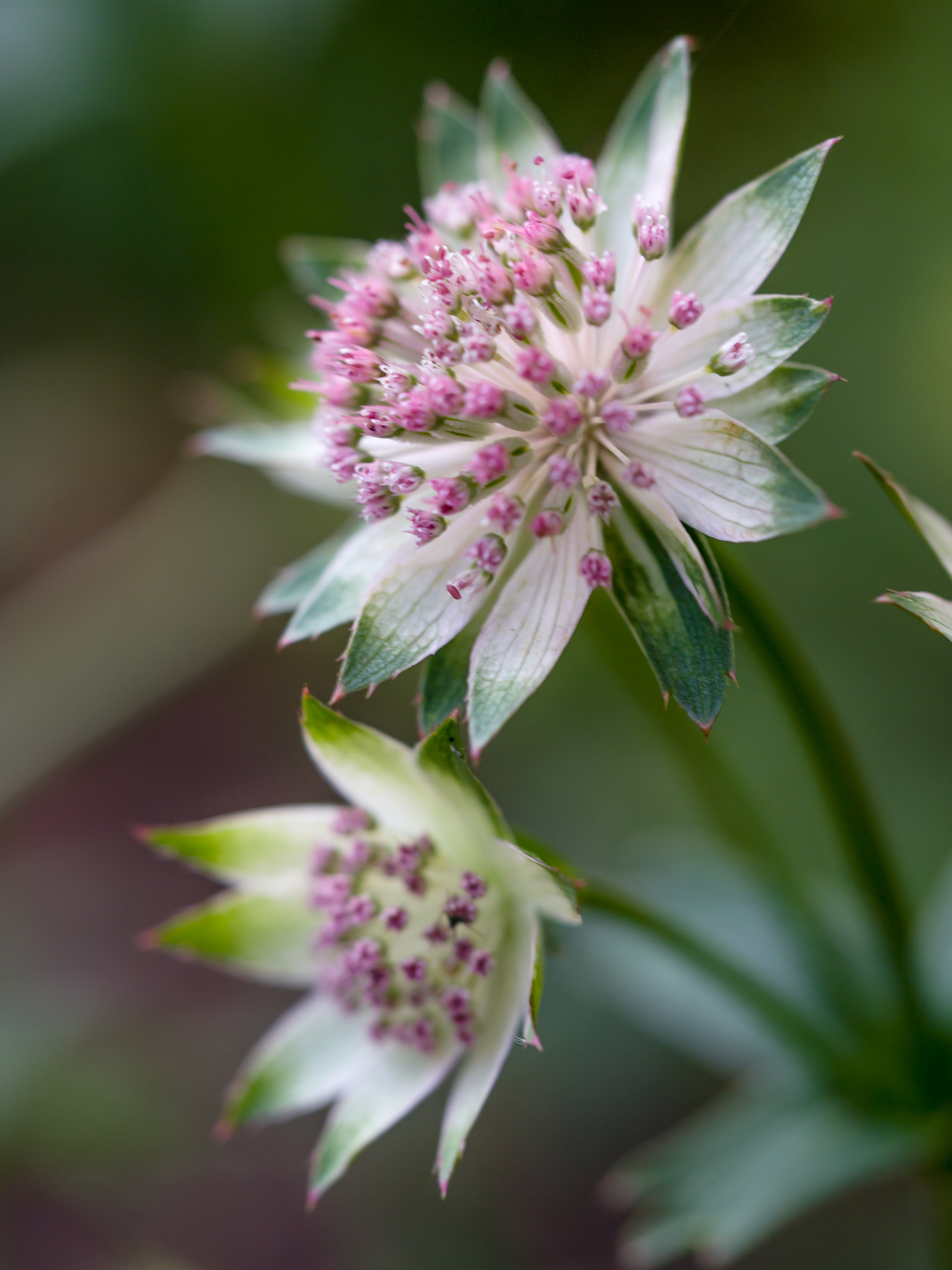

The genus name derived from the Latin 'aster' meaning star and this refers to the open star-shaped floral bracts of the plant.

== Species ==
As of December 2022, Plants of the World Online accepted 10 species, while GRIN Taxonomy listed only five species (marked "G" below).

- Astrantia bavarica F.W.Schultz
- Astrantia carniolica Wulfen (G)
- Astrantia colchica Albov (G)
- Astrantia major L. (G)
- Astrantia maxima Pall. (G)
- Astrantia minor L. (G)
- Astrantia ossica Woronow ex Grossh.
- Astrantia pauciflora Bertol.
- Astrantia pontica Albov
- Astrantia trifida Hoffm.

== Common names ==
The astrantia has many common garden names including melancholy gentleman, masterwort and Hattie's pincushion.

== Herbal usage ==
The stems and rhizomes of the Astrantia can be used for medicinal purposes. They provide an essential oil that can be used as a stomachic. The dried leaves of the plant can be used in herbal medicines as an infusion to help with digestion and help stimulate appetite.

== Cultivation ==
Many strains of Astrantia have been selected for their value in the garden, where they grow well if given reasonable soil, some shade and moisture. Their unusual pincushion flowerheads provide summer colour in shades of red, pink and white. A. maxima 'Largest masterwort' has gained the Royal Horticultural Society's Award of Garden Merit.

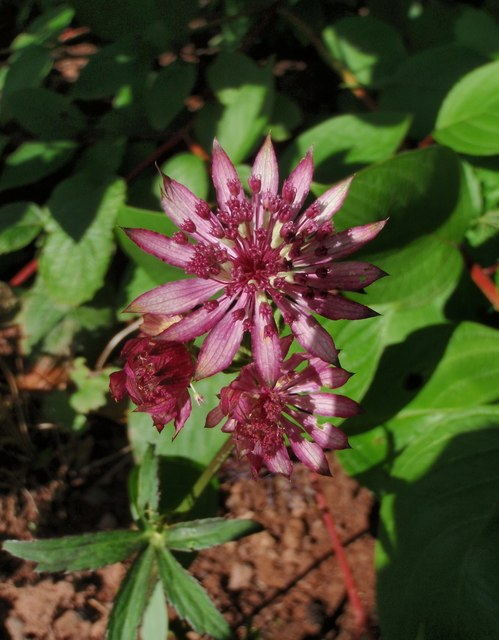
Rubra variety

A number of garden varieties have red flowers, e.g. A. carniolica 'Rubra'.

== Sources ==
- Global Biodiversity Information Facility: Astrantia
