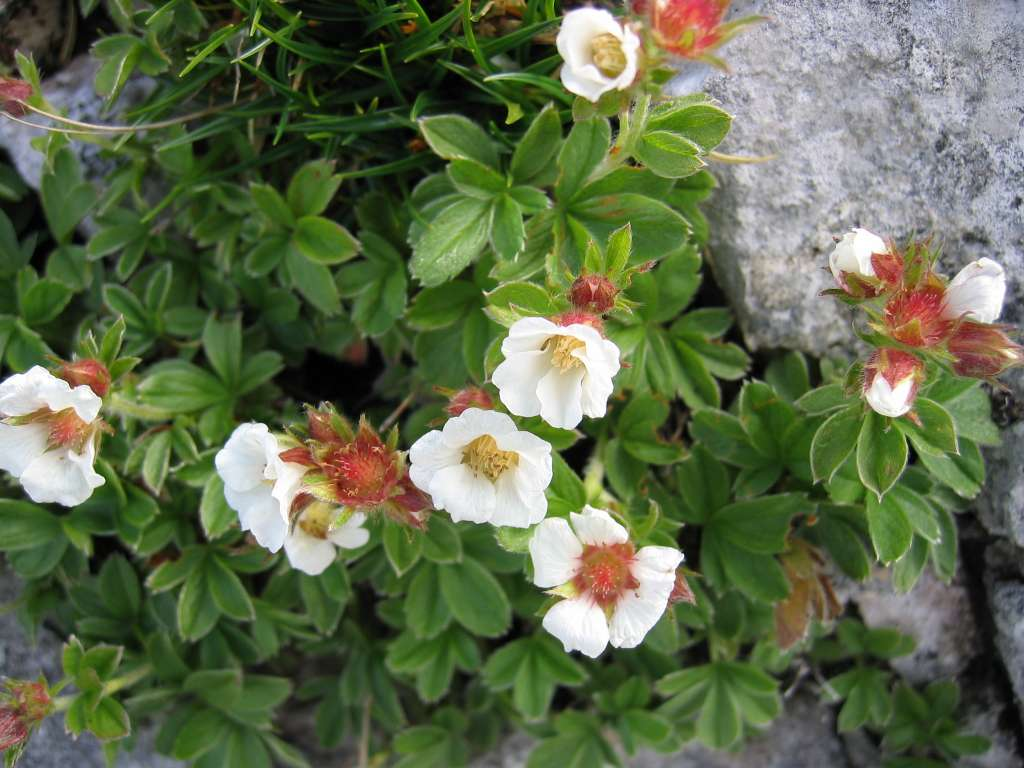
- In bloom, August
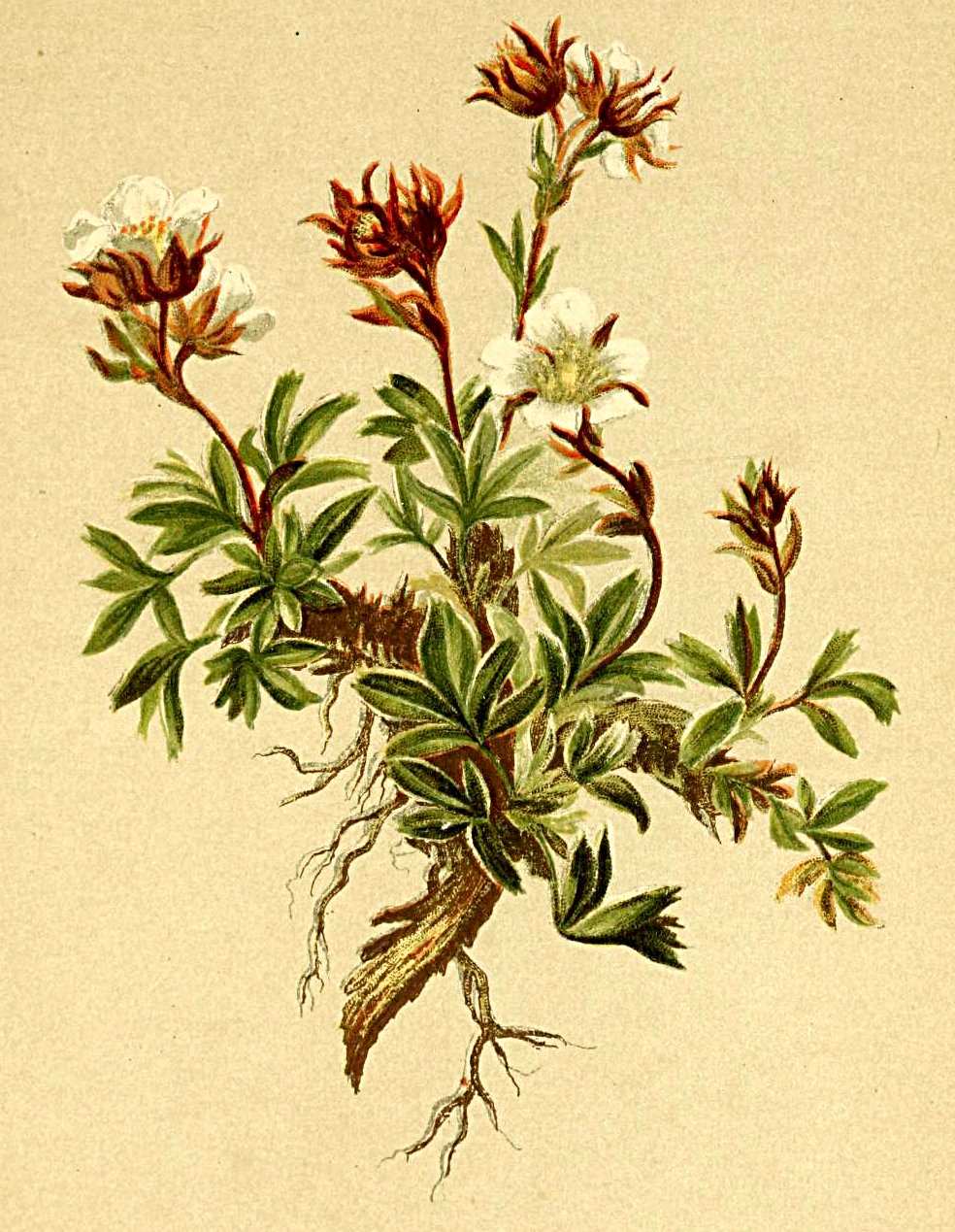
- Botanical illustration

Scientific classification
- Kingdom: Plantae
- Clade: Tracheophytes
- Clade: Angiosperms
- Clade: Eudicots
- Clade: Rosids
- Order: Rosales
- Family: Rosaceae
- Genus: Potentilla
- Species: P. clusiana

Binomial name
- Potentilla clusiana Jacq.

Synonyms
- Fragariastrum clusianum (Jacq.) Schur; Potentilla caulescens Jacq.; Potentilla caulescens Scop.; Potentilla clusiana subsp. triphylla Tratt.; Trichothalamus clusianus (Jacq.) Spreng.

= Potentilla clusiana =

Species of plant

Potentilla clusiana, the eastern cinquefoil, is a species of flowering plant in the family Rosaceae. It is native to the Eastern Alps and the Dinarides, and it has been introduced to the former Czechoslovakia. Along with Draba stellata it is a co-dominant species of alpine rock-faces.

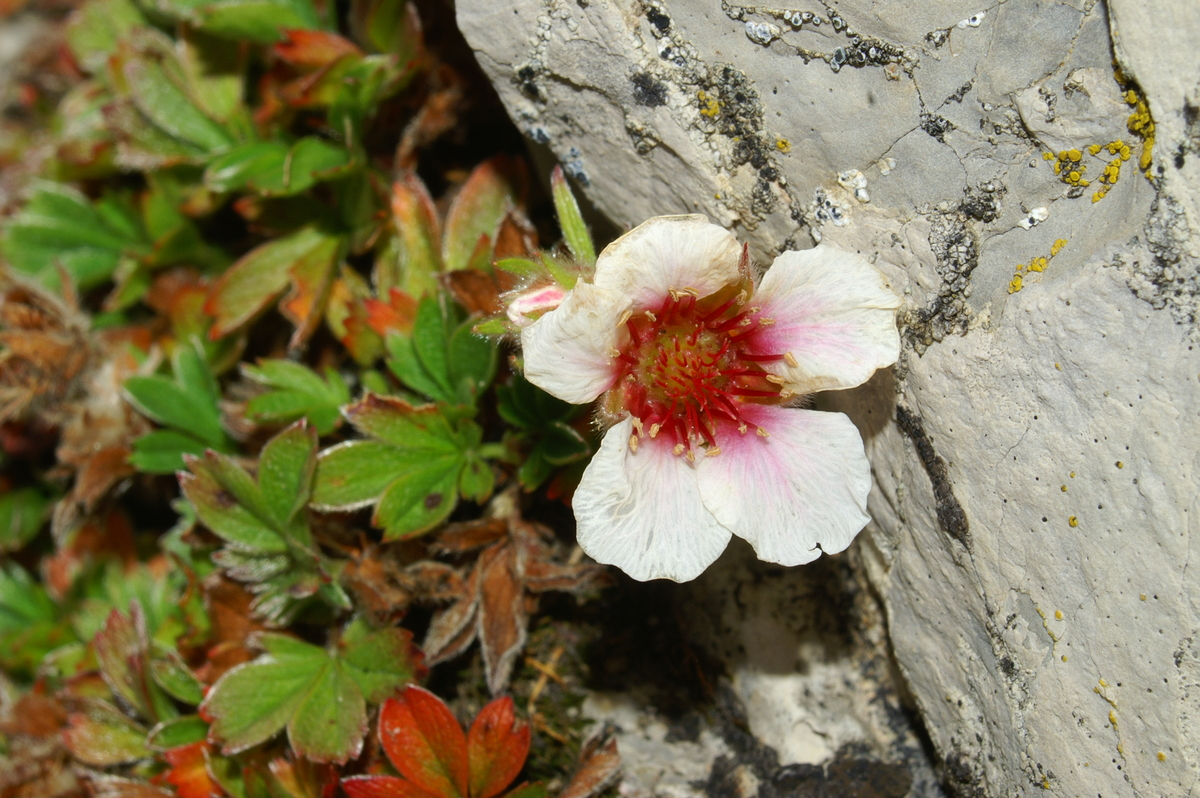
Close up of a flower with a hint of pink in the throat

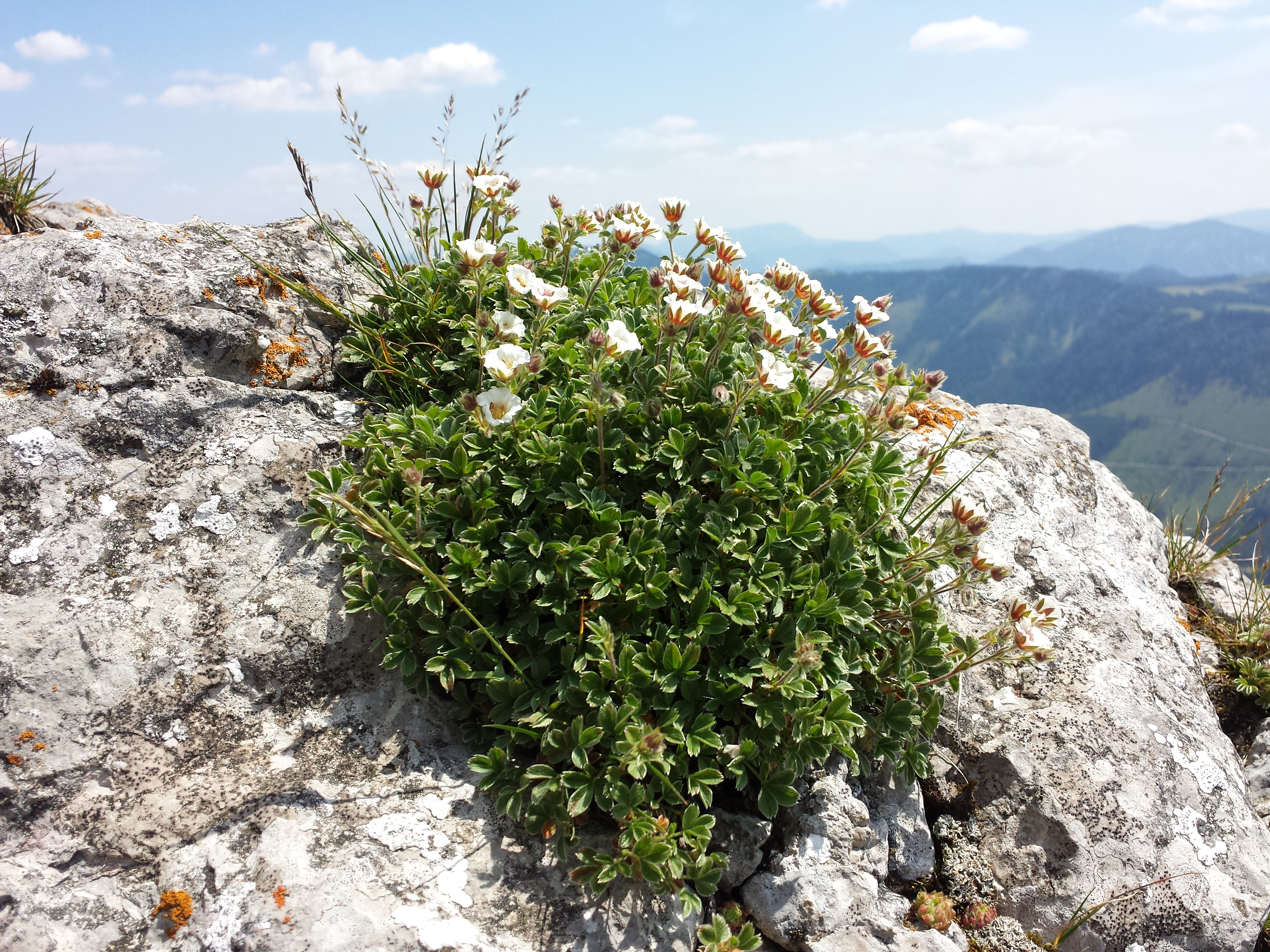
Near Ötscher mountain

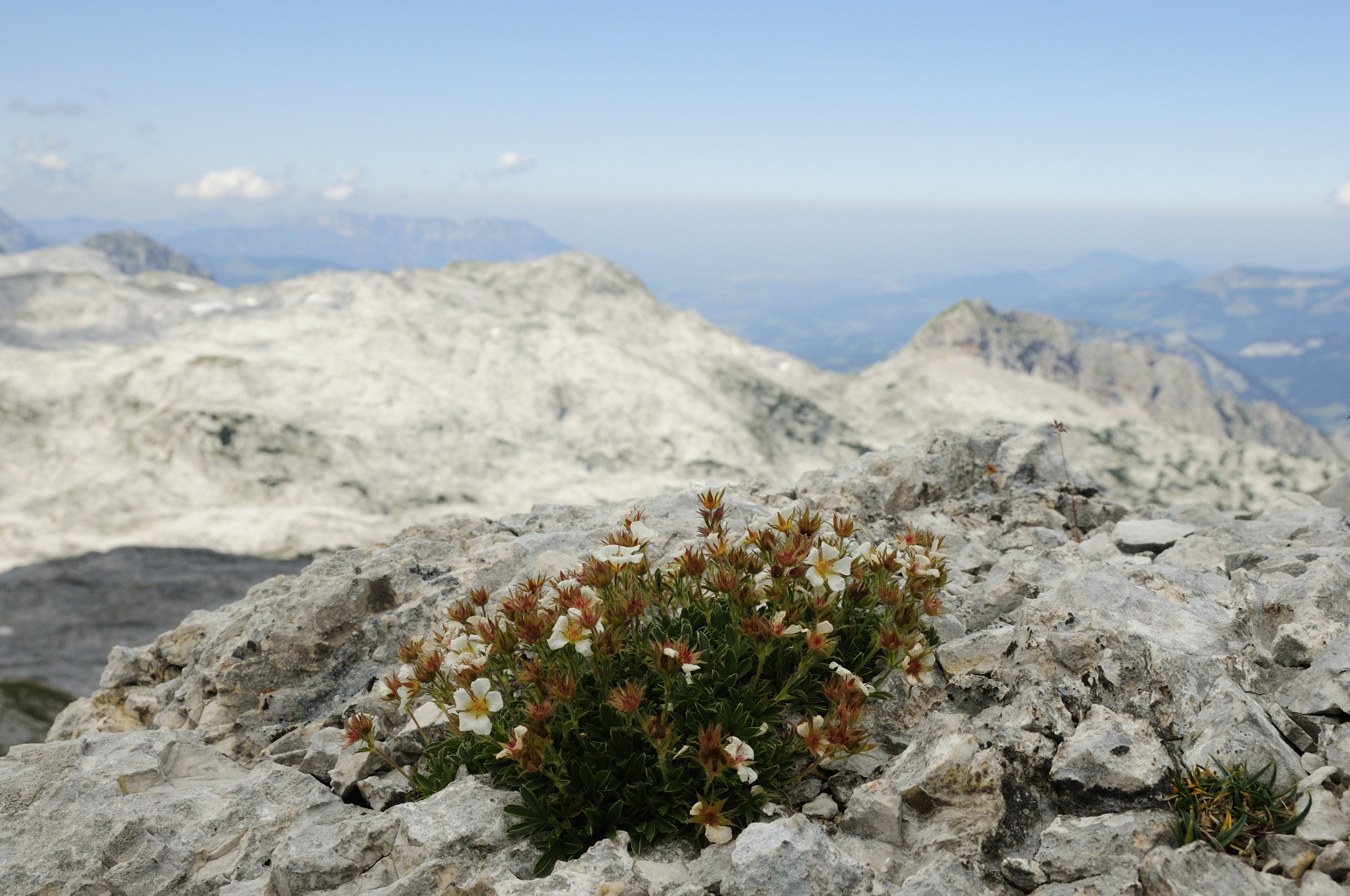
At 2,360 m (7,740 ft) on the slopes of Bleikogel

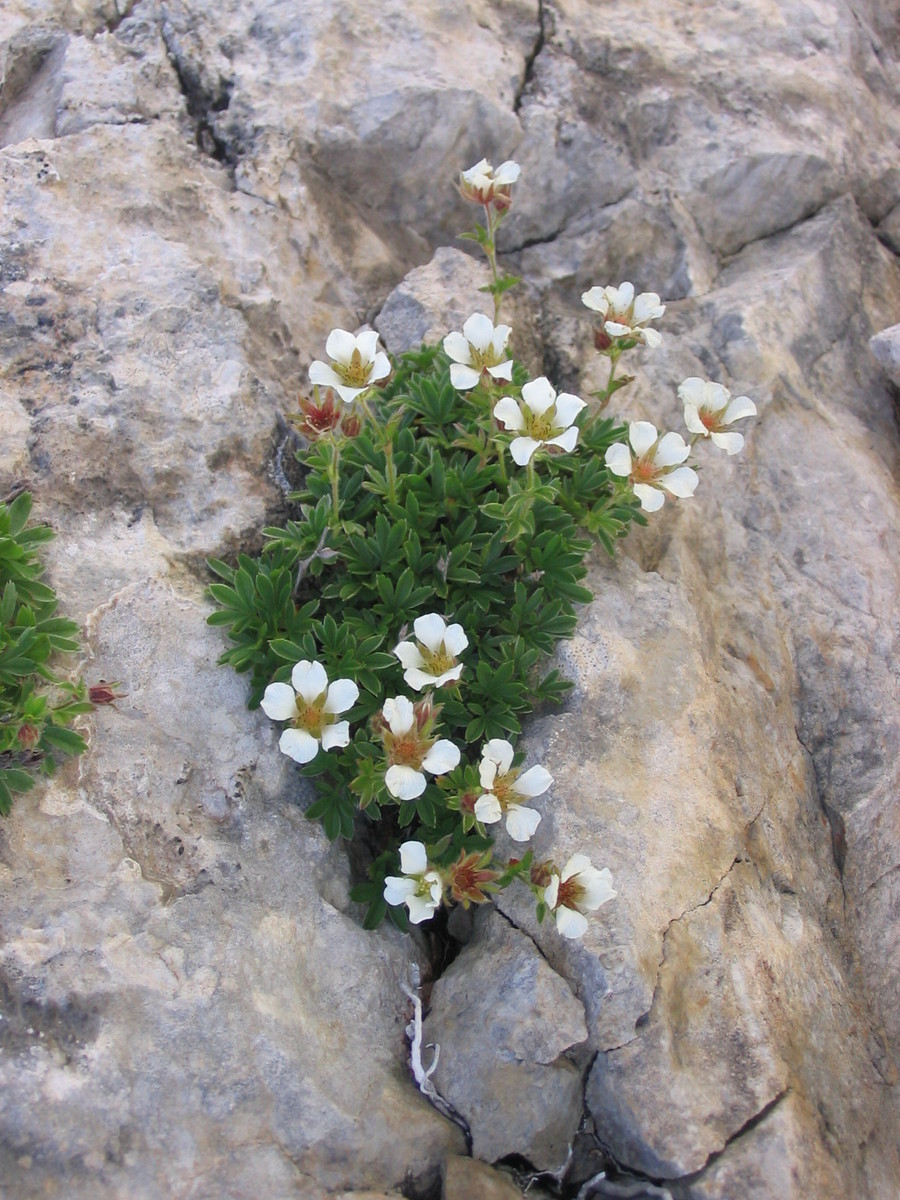
In Slovenia
