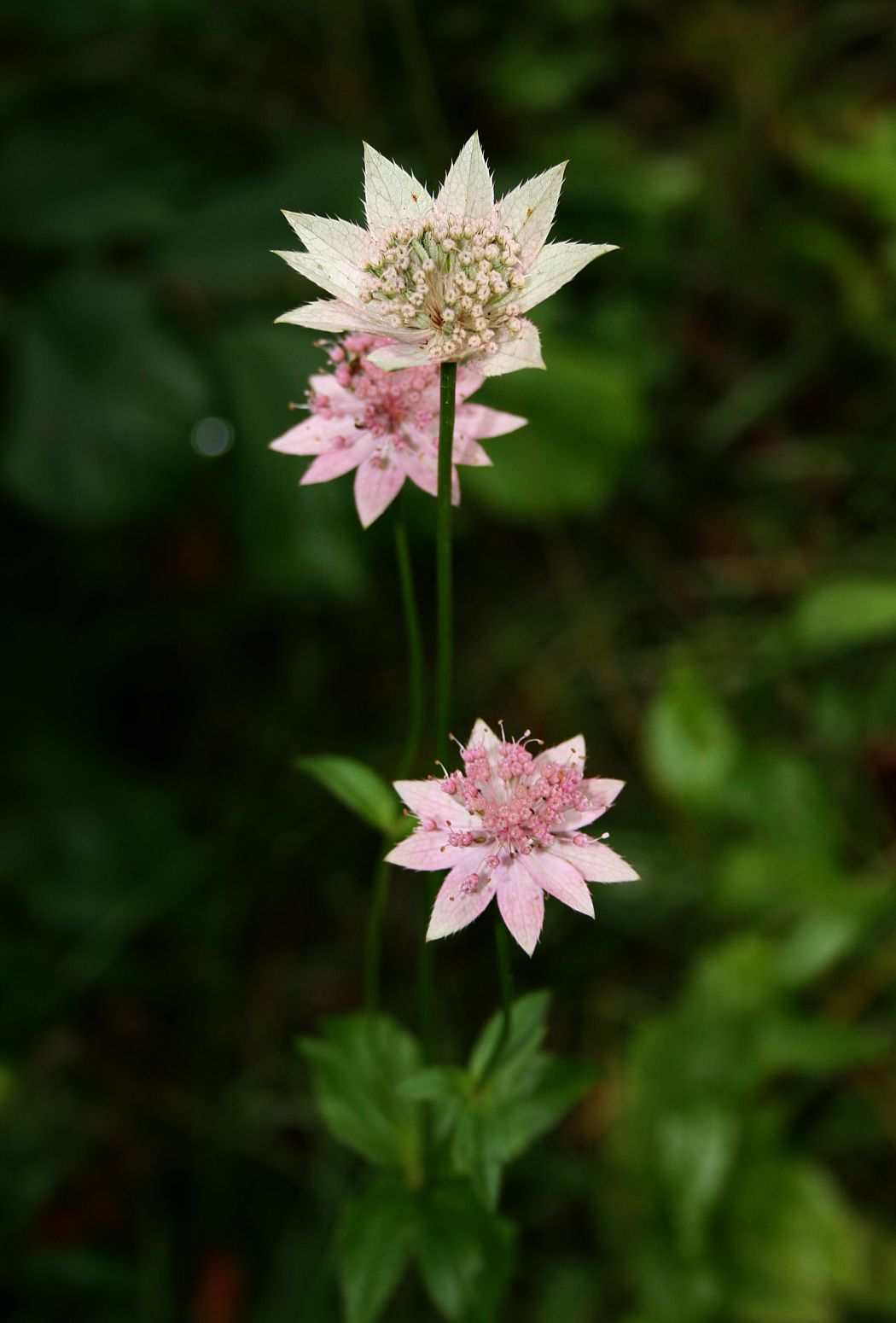

Scientific classification
- Kingdom: Plantae
- Clade: Embryophytes
- Clade: Tracheophytes
- Clade: Spermatophytes
- Clade: Angiosperms
- Clade: Eudicots
- Clade: Asterids
- Order: Apiales
- Family: Apiaceae
- Genus: Astrantia
- Species: A. maxima

Binomial name
- Astrantia maxima L.

Synonyms
- Astrantia helleborifolia Salisb.; Astrantia heterophylla Willd.; Astrantia speciosa Heynh.

= Astrantia maxima =

Species of flowering plant

Astrantia maxima, (largest masterwort), is a species of flowering plant in the family Apiaceae.

Growing to 90 cm (35 in) tall by 60 cm (24 in) broad, it is an herbaceous perennial, used in gardens. It is hardy to USDA Zone: 4-9. It has gained the Royal Horticultural Society's Award of Garden Merit.

== Description ==
Astrantia maxima reaches on average 90 centimetres (35 in) of height. The stem is erect and glabrous, with little branches and few leaves. The basal leaves have a long petiole 10–20 centimetres (3.9–7.9 in), 3 to 7 lobes and toothed segments. Size: 8–15 centimetres (3.1–5.9 in). The cauline (borne on the stem as opposed to basal) leaves are generally two, sessile, amplexicaul and lanceolate-shaped with a trilobed apex. The inflorescence is umbrella-shaped, 2–3 centimetres (0.79–1.18 in) in diameter. The floral bracts are numerous (10 - 20), 10–18 millimetres (0.39–0.71 in) long, pinkish (sometimes white) with acuminate apex. The small flowers are pinkish-white. The central ones are hermaphrodite, while the external ones are male. The flowering period extends from May to July.

== Reproduction ==
Astrantia maxima is an entomophilous plant, mainly pollinated by beetles, but also by other insects. This perennial plant reproduces itself also by means of buds present at the ground level. The plant can also be grown from seed for garden usage. The seeds require a 2-3 month period of cold stratification for germination to take place.

== Taxonomy ==
It was found by botanist Peter Simon Pallas in 1790. It was first published and described by Pallas in 'Nova Acta Acad. Sci. Imp. Petrop. Hist. Acad.' Vol.7 on page 357 in 1793.

It was also previously known as the 'hellebore-leaved masterwort'.

=== Etymology ===
The specific epithet maxima, meaning "largest", distinguishes this species from its smaller relatives Astrantia minor and Astrantia major.

== Distribution and habitat ==
These plants, native to Europe, are widespread in the Caucasus. They have been grown in the British Isles since 1804.

In Turkey, they are common in woodlands and lush meadows, at an altitude of 1,300–2,400 metres (4,300–7,900 ft) above sea level.

Also common in Turkey is the subspecies Astrantia maxima Pallas subsp. haradjianii.

== Cultivation ==
Astrantia maxima grows well in the garden, given some shade and moisture. Its flowerheads provide summer colour in shades of red, pink and white. It is also rabbit resistant. It is rated for hardiness, USDA zones 5 to 9.

=== Cultivars ===
- Astrantia major 'Hadspen Blood' is a hybrid of Astrantia major and A. maxima.
- Astrantia maxima 'Mark Fenwick', listed on some nurseries and recently onto the RHS Catalogue.
- Astrantia maxima 'Rosea', listed on some nurseries but not on RHS Catalogue.
