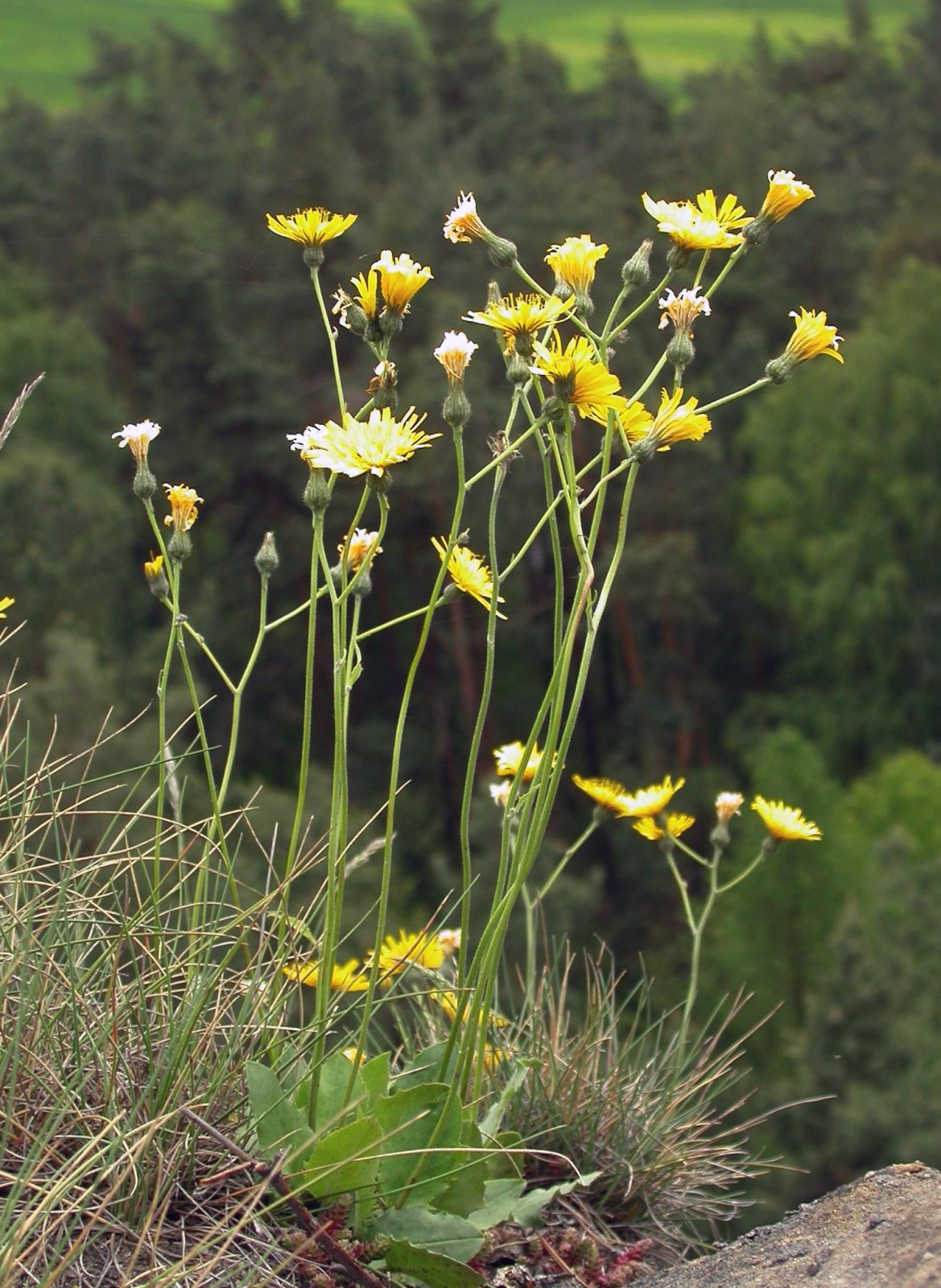

Scientific classification
- Kingdom: Plantae
- Clade: Tracheophytes
- Clade: Angiosperms
- Clade: Eudicots
- Clade: Asterids
- Order: Asterales
- Family: Asteraceae
- Genus: Hieracium
- Species: H. bifidum

Binomial name
- Hieracium bifidum Kit. ex Hornem.

= Hieracium bifidum =

Species of flowering plant

Hieracium bifidum is a species of flowering plant belonging to the family Asteraceae.

Its native range is Europe.

Subspecies:

- Hieracium bifidum subsp. submaculosum (Dahlst.) Zahn (synonym: Hieracium prolixum Norrl.)
