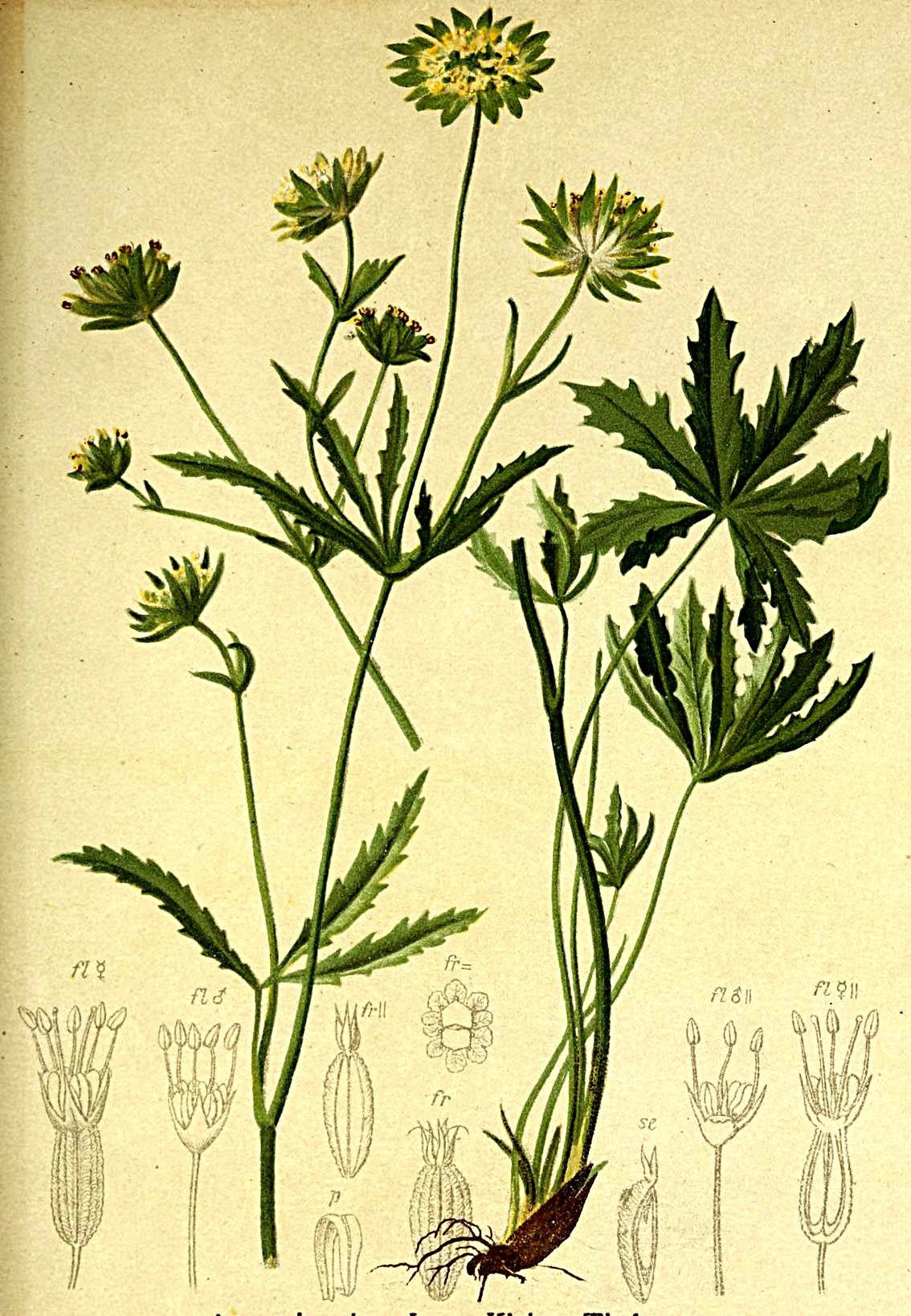

Scientific classification
- Kingdom: Plantae
- Clade: Tracheophytes
- Clade: Angiosperms
- Clade: Eudicots
- Clade: Asterids
- Order: Apiales
- Family: Apiaceae
- Genus: Astrantia
- Species: A. minor

Binomial name
- Astrantia minor L.

Synonyms
- Astrantia alpoina Clairv.; Astrantia major subsp. minor (L.) Bonnier & Layens; Astrantia digitata Moench

= Astrantia minor =

Species of flowering plant

Astrantia minor, the lesser masterwort, is a species of herbaceous plant belonging to the family of Apiaceae. It is native within Europe, to the countries of France, Italy, Spain and Switzerland. It is clump-forming herbaceous perennial.

== Description ==
Astrantia minor is a flowering plant that often reaches 15–30 cm in height, with simple stems, rarely branched in the upper half, the basal leaves are of two types, often on the same plant: one with narrow segments that are all pinnatisect, the other with broad segments, the central being pinnatisect and the lateral being deeply pinnatipartite; petioles 4–12 cm; the leaf blade with (5) 7 (8) segments of 1-3 (4.5) x 0.5 -1.3 cm, pale green, toothed in upper half or two thirds, the stem at the base of the inflorescence, from 2 to 3.2 x 0.2-0.5 cm reduced to 3-5 segments. Inflorescence with 1-3 peduncles unequal, the central, sometimes branched, and longer than the sides that have unique umbels; Umbels surrounded by (10) 12-14 bracts, 4-10 x 1–3 mm, membranous, entire, the apex green with three ribs. The flowers are 30-40 per umbel, of the same length or slightly shorter than the bracts, generally hermaphroditic in the centre and male peripherally. Calices have teeth about 1 mm in size, ovate-oblong, subobtuse and slightly bearded (1.5-2 times longer than wide). Petals are similar in size to the sepals and white or cream. Stamens exserted. Fruit ovoid (1.5) 2–5 mm with scales in the form of a vesicle, sub-obtuse. Flowering occurs in summer, from July to August and fruiting between August and September.

It differs from its congener Astrantia major, by its smaller size, and basal leaves of seven segments (instead of five) with calyx teeth that are obtuse and slightly mucronate.

== Habitat ==
Found in some clumps of large plants near streams and in clearings in the scrubland of mountain azalea (Rhododendron ferrugineum), on fresh alpine and subalpine soil. It prefers a pure salicaceous substrate, at elevations of (1850) 2100 - 2300 (2600) meters.

== Distribution ==
It is endemic to central and southern Europe (France, Switzerland, Italy and Spain). On the Iberian Peninsula, it is found only in the Pyrenees, the Catalan lands and Huesca where it is found in the extreme southwest Valle de Benasque.

== Taxonomy ==
In the UK, it has the common name of small black masterwort.

It was first published and described by Carl Linnaeus in his book Species Plantarum on page 235 in 1753.

It was verified by United States Department of Agriculture's Agricultural Research Service on 5 January 2000.

== Other sources ==
- Aldén, B., S. Ryman, & M. Hjertson. 2012. Svensk Kulturväxtdatabas, SKUD (Swedish Cultivated and Utility Plants Database; online resource) www.skud.info
- Botanical Society of the British Isles. BSBI taxon database (on-line resource). URL: http://rbg-web2.rbge.org.uk/BSBI/taxonsearch.php
- Pignatti, S. 1982. Flora d'Italia.
- Tutin, T. G. et al., eds. 1964-1980. Flora europaea.
