= Adriano Fiori =

Italian botanist (1865–1950)

Adriano Fiori (17 December 1865, Casinalbo – 5 November 1950, Casinalbo) was an Italian botanist.

He studied medicine and natural sciences at the University of Modena, then spent several years working as an assistant at the botanical institute in Padua (1892–1900). From 1900 to 1913, he was a professor of natural sciences at the Forestry Institute of Vallombrosa, and from 1913 to 1936, he served as a professor in Florence.

During his career, he travelled extensively throughout Italy, during which he studied and collected many plant specimens. He also spent considerable time botanizing in the Italian colony of Eritrea. He donated tens of thousands of specimens to the herbarium in Florence that included 1300 items from Eritrea. With Augusto Béguinot and Renato Pampanini, Fiori edited and distributed the exsiccata Flora Italica exsiccata and subsequent series. Between 1905 and 1927 Fiori published the exsiccata work Xylothomotheca Italica distributing cross-sections and longitudinal sections of wood from 184 trees and shrubs in Italy.

== Principal published works ==
- Flora analitica d'Italia, (with Giulio Paoletti), 1896–1904.
- Piante raccolte nella colonia eritrea nel 1909 (Plants collected in the colony of Eritrea in 1909), 1913.
- Nuova flora analitica d'Italia, 1923–1929.
- Iconographia florae italicae (with Giulio Paoletti), 1933.
