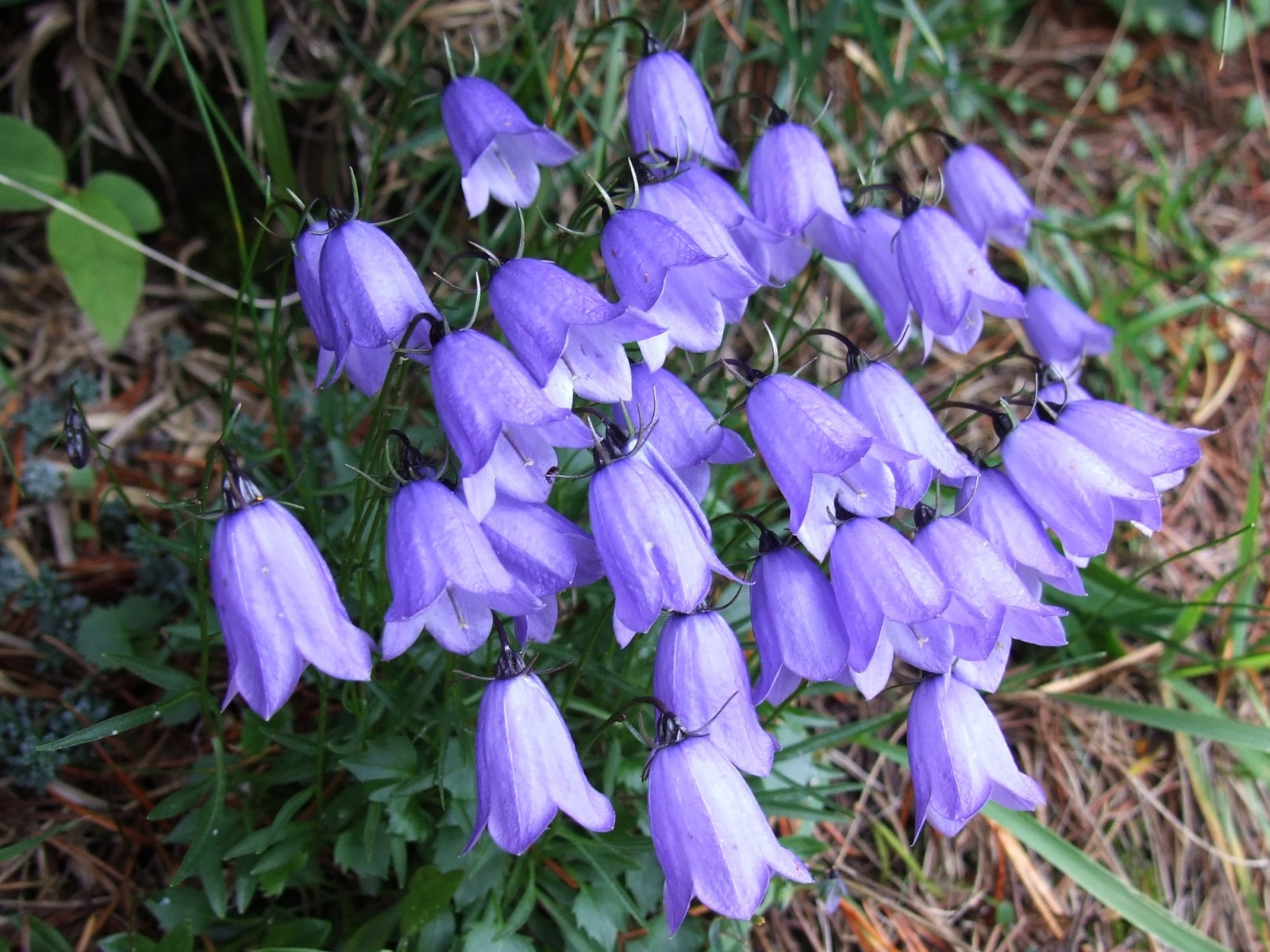

Scientific classification
- Kingdom: Plantae
- Clade: Tracheophytes
- Clade: Angiosperms
- Clade: Eudicots
- Clade: Asterids
- Order: Asterales
- Family: Campanulaceae
- Genus: Campanula
- Species: C. cochleariifolia

Binomial name
- Campanula cochleariifolia Lam.

= Campanula cochleariifolia =

Species of flowering plant in the bellflower family

Campanula cochleariifolia (also Campanula cochlearifolia), common name earleaf bellflower or fairy's-thimble, is a species of flowering plant in the family Campanulaceae, native to the Pyrenees, Alps, French Massif Central, and Carpathian Mountains of Central Europe. It is a rhizomatous herbaceous perennial growing to 10 cm (4 in). Clumps of bright green leaves produce nodding pale blue bell flowers on wiry stalks. It is often found growing on limestone.

This plant has gained the Royal Horticultural Society's Award of Garden Merit.
