= Maria Skalińska =

Polish botanist (1890-1977)

Maria Skalińska (1890-1977) was a Polish botanist and professor who studied plant anatomy and cell biology, particularly the plants of the Tatra Mountains. She was the first to describe the species Poa nobilis. The standard author abbreviation Skalińska is used to indicate this person as the author when citing a botanical name.
