= Renato Pampanini =

Italian botanist (1875–1949)

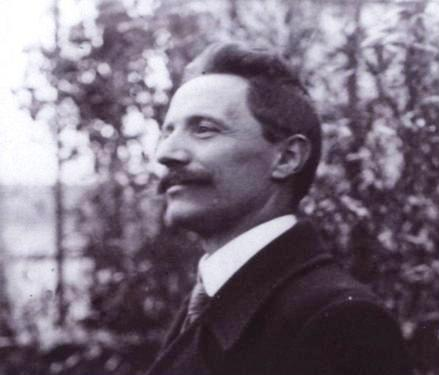
- Born: 20 October 1875
- Died: 19 July 1949 (aged 73)
- Occupation: Botanist, mycologist, curator, ecologist, university teacher

Renato Pampanini (1875-1949) was an Italian botanist and mycologist.

== Life ==
Pampanini was born in Valdobbiadene, Italy in 1875.

Pampanini studied at the University of Geneva, then in Lausanne and in Friborg. He presented his thesis at the University of Florence.

In addition to his own scientific research, he carried out numerous botanical expeditions, notably to Cyrenaica and other regions of North Africa, to the Rhodes and the Dodecanese islands. He was also one of the first Italian botanists to address issues of environmental protection.

Pampanin died in Vittorio Veneto, Italy in 1949.

The Pampanini herbarium is named for him. It includes more than 5,000 specimens. It is located in the central Italian herbarium of the Museo di Storia Naturale di Firenze. With Augusto Béguinot and Adriano Fiori Pampanini edited and distributed the exsiccata Flora Italica exsiccata.
