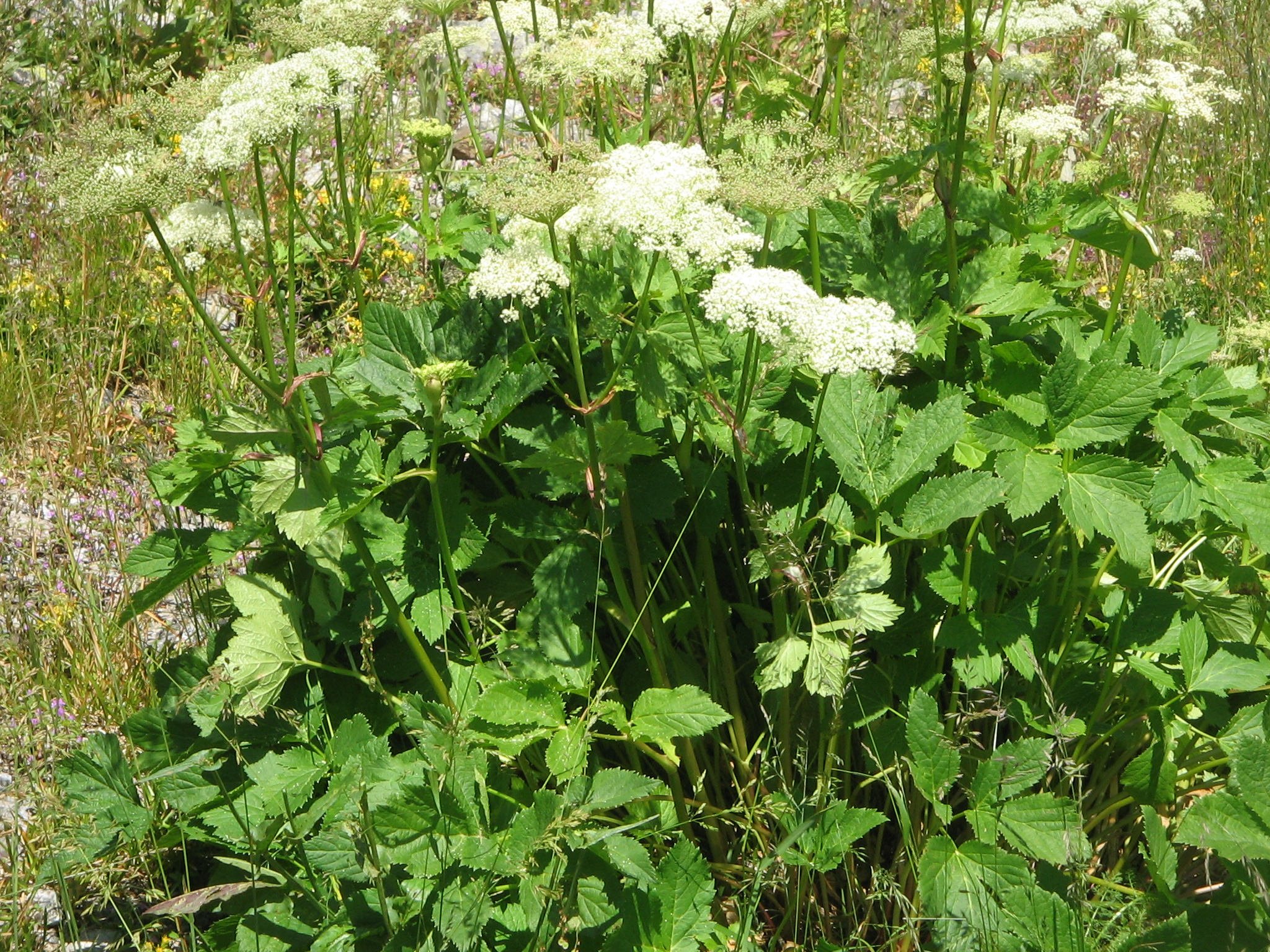

Scientific classification
- Kingdom: Plantae
- Clade: Embryophytes
- Clade: Tracheophytes
- Clade: Angiosperms
- Clade: Eudicots
- Clade: Asterids
- Order: Apiales
- Family: Apiaceae
- Genus: Peucedanum
- Species: P. ostruthium

Binomial name
- Peucedanum ostruthium (L.) W. D. J. Koch

Synonyms
- Imperatoria ostruthium L.

= Peucedanum ostruthium =

Masterwort

Species of flowering plant

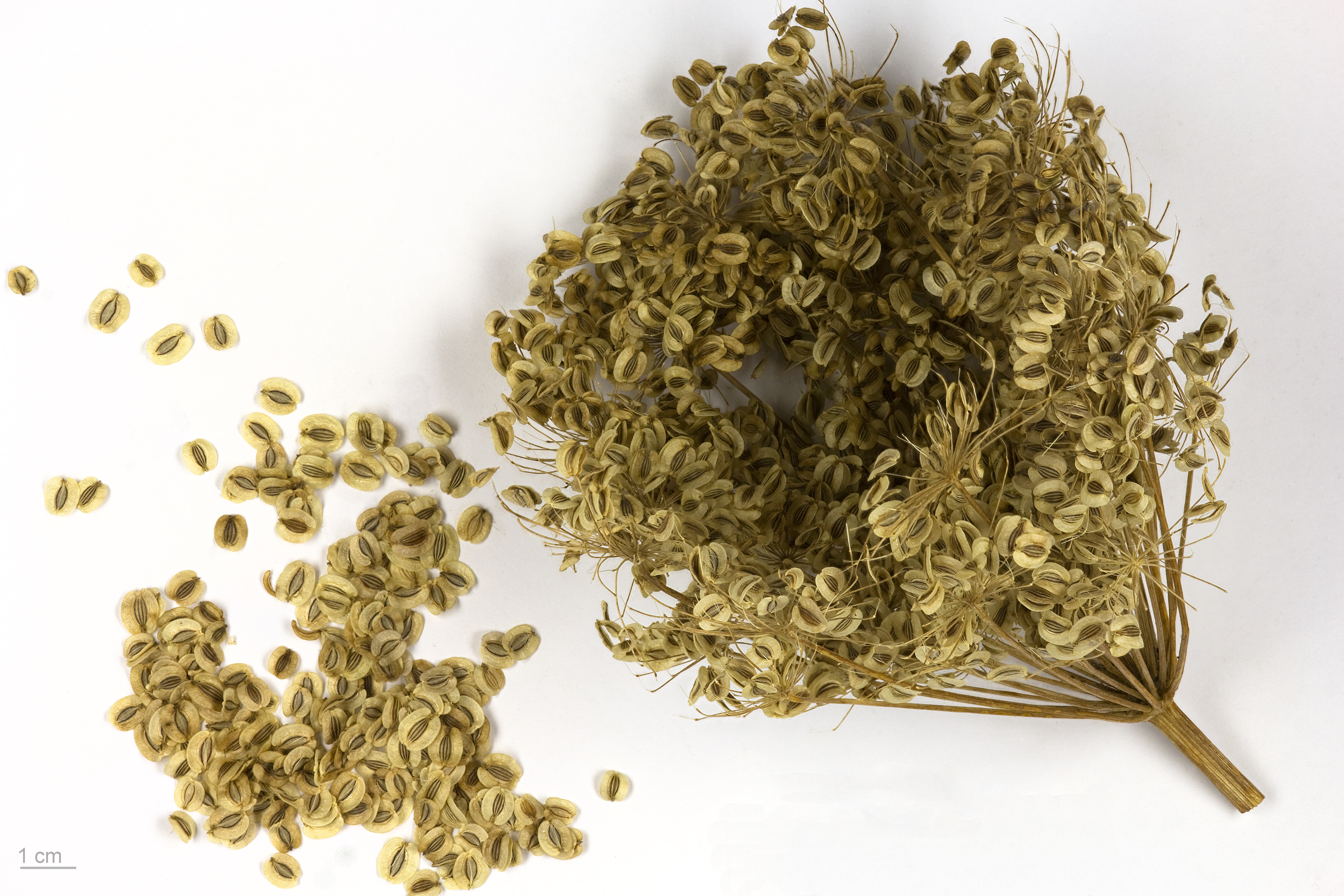
Peucedanum ostruthium - MHNT

Peucedanum ostruthium or Imperatoria ostruthium, masterwort, is a species of flowering plant in the family Apiaceae. It is native to the mountains of Central and Southern Europe, but has been widely introduced outside its native range.

== Distribution ==
Masterwort is native to the mountains of Central and Southern Europe, including the Carpathians, Alps, northern Apennines, Massif Central and isolated occurrences in the Iberian Peninsula. It has, however, been widely introduced and cultivated and its native range is therefore not entirely clear.

== Use ==
Masterwort is used as a flavouring for various liqueurs and bitters. Its roots and leaves have been used in traditional Austrian medicine internally (as tea, liqueurs and wine) and externally (as fumigation, tincture or incense) for treatment of disorders of the gastrointestinal tract, skin, respiratory tract, cardiovascular system, infections, fever, flu and colds.

== Chemical constituents ==
The plant is a source of coumarins, including oxypeucedanin, ostruthol, imperatorin, osthole, isoimperatorin and ostruthin.
