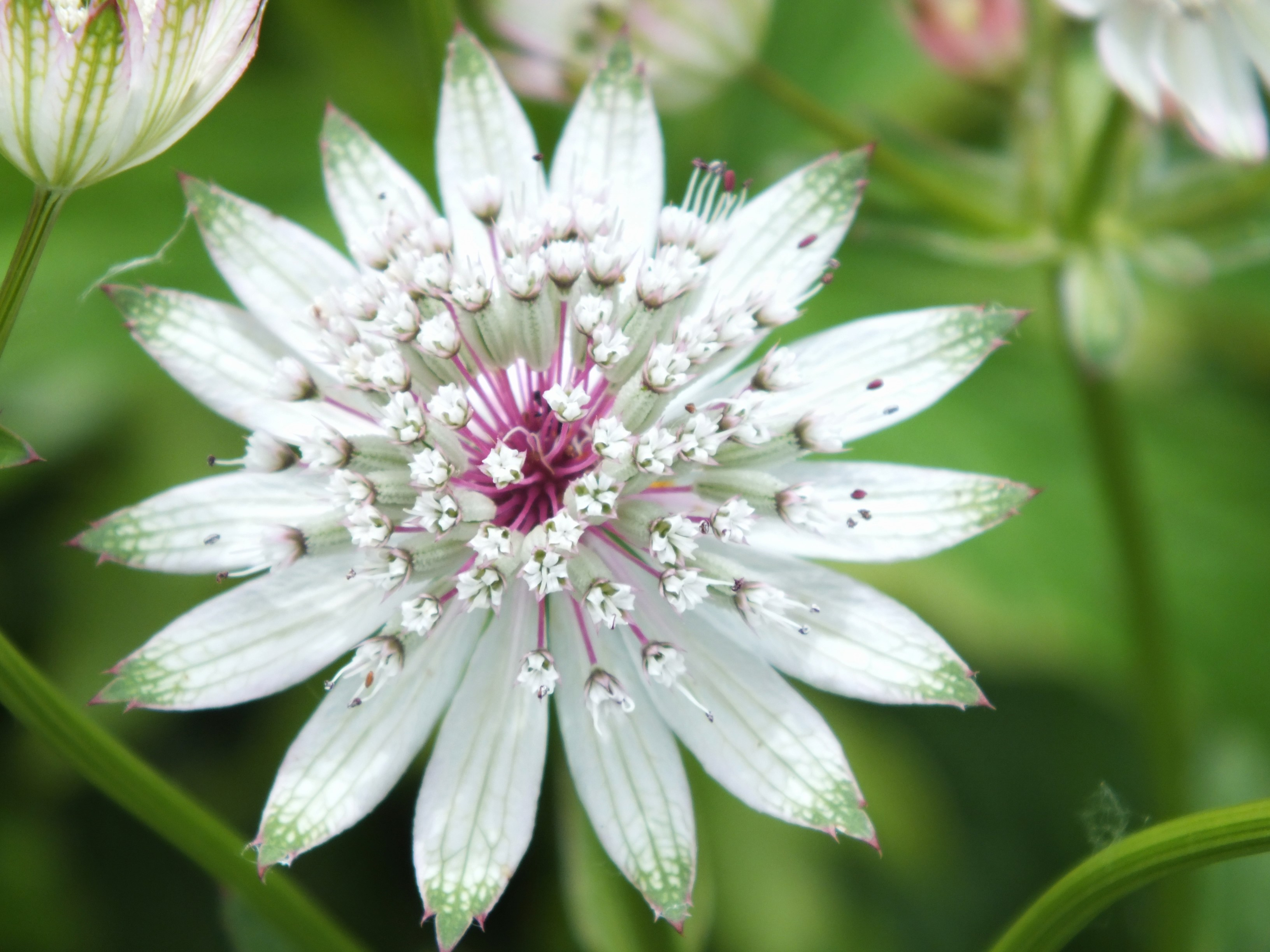

Scientific classification
- Kingdom: Plantae
- Clade: Tracheophytes
- Clade: Angiosperms
- Clade: Eudicots
- Clade: Asterids
- Order: Apiales
- Family: Apiaceae
- Genus: Astrantia
- Species: A. major

Binomial name
- Astrantia major L.

Synonyms
- Sanicula astrantia E.H.L.Krause; Astrantia major var. brevicaule Losa & P.Monts.

= Astrantia major =

Species of flowering plant

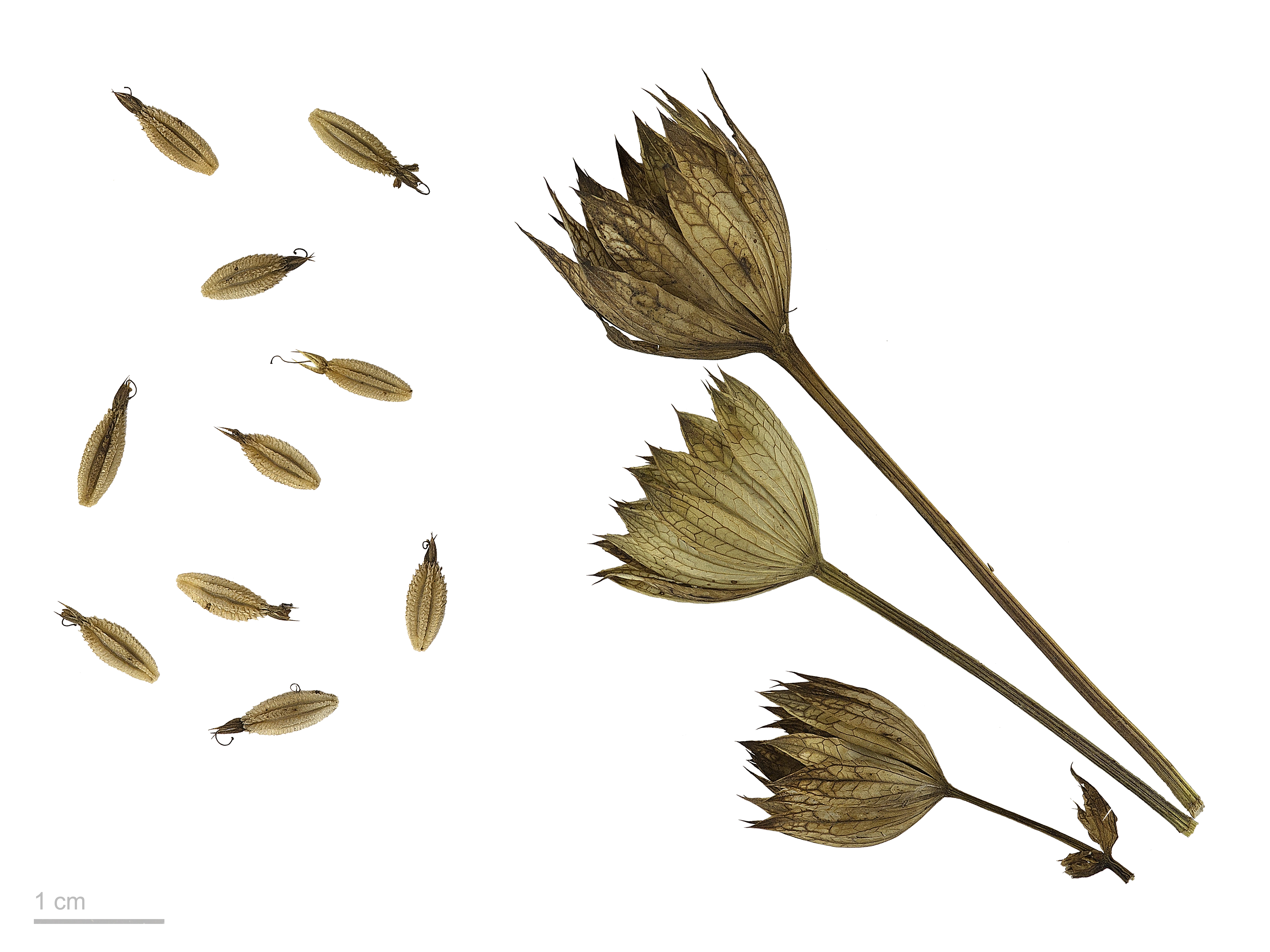
Astrantia major - MHNT

Astrantia major, the great masterwort, is a species of flowering plant in the family Apiaceae, native to central and eastern Europe. Growing up to 90 cm (35 in) tall by 45 cm (18 in) broad, it is an herbaceous perennial, much used in gardens.

== Etymology ==
The Latin specific epithet major, meaning "larger", distinguishes this species from its smaller relative Astrantia minor.

== Description ==
Astrantia major reaches on average 60 centimetres (24 in) of height. The stem is erect and glabrous, with little branches and few leaves. The basal leaves have a long petiole 10–20 centimetres (3.9–7.9 in), 3 to 7 lobes and toothed segments. Size: 8–15 centimetres (3.1–5.9 in). The cauline leaves are generally two, sessile, amplexicaul and lanceolate-shaped with a trilobed apex. The inflorescence is umbrella-shaped, with 2–3 centimetres (0.79–1.18 in) of diameter. The floral bracts are numerous (10 - 20), 10–18 millimetres (0.39–0.71 in) long, reddish (sometimes white) with acuminate apex. The small flowers are greenish-white with reddish shades. The central ones are hermaphrodite, while the external ones are male. The petals are five, white (or slightly reddened), while the stamens are five and much longer. Size of the flowers: about 1 mm. The flowering period extends from June through September.

=== Biochemistry ===
The plant also produces an essential oil that can be used in herbal medicines.

== Reproduction ==
Astrantia major is an entomophilous plant, mainly pollinated by beetles, but also by other insects. This perennial plant reproduces itself also by means of buds present at the ground level.

== Distribution and habitat ==
This plant is native to southern Europe (the Pyrenees, Carpathians and Balkans), but also in the Caucasus up to Anatolia. It is found in the countries of Albania, Austria, Belarus, Bulgaria, Czechoslovakia, France, Germany, Greece, Hungary, Italy, North Caucasus, Poland, Romania, Spain, Switzerland, Ukraine and Yugoslavia.

It has been in the British Isles since the 16th century. It has also naturalized in Shropshire near Stokesay Castle, and in Worcestershire.

It is common in mountain meadows and grasslands, in forests and clearings, and close to the streams, usually on calcareous soils, at an elevation of 100–2,300 metres (330–7,550 ft) above sea level.

== Subspecies ==
- Astrantia major subsp. carinthiaca (Hoppe) Arcang. : Larger umbels (4–5 cm in diameter) widespread mainly in the eastern Alps.
- Astrantia major var. involucrata Koch
- Astrantia major subsp. elatior (Frivaldsky) Maly: bracts with 5 nerves and with notched apex; teeth of the calyx are very long; widespread in the Apennines.
- Astrantia caucasica Auct. Fl.Ital non Sprengel
- Astrantia major subsp. major
- Astrantia major subsp. biebersteinii (Fisch. & C.A.Mey.) I.Grint. (with synonyms of Astrantia biebersteinii Fisch. & C.A.Mey.,Astrantia colchica Albov, Astrantia intermedia Bieb., Astrantia neglecta C.Koch & Bouche, Astrantia orientalis Woronow, Astrantia ossica Woronow and Astrantia trifida Hoffm.)

Kew only accepts (in 2022); Astrantia major subsp. apenninica Wörz, Astrantia major subsp. carinthiaca (Hoppe ex W.D.J.Koch) Arcang., Astrantia major subsp. elatior (Friv.) K.Malý, Astrantia major subsp. major and Astrantia major subsp. pyrenaica Wörz

== Cultivation ==
Many strains of Astrantia major grow well in the garden, given some shade and moisture. Their flowerheads provide summer colour in shades of red, pink and white. The following cultivars have gained the Royal Horticultural Society's Award of Garden Merit:-

- A. major 'Roma'
- 'Sunningdale Variegated'

Other cultivars include:-

- 'Abbey Road'
- 'Ruby Cloud'
- 'Rubra'
- 'Snow Star'
- 'Lars'
- 'Moulin Rouge'
- 'Star of Heaven'
- 'Rosea'
- 'Princess Sturdza'
- 'Venice'
- 'Magnum Blush'
- 'Star of Beauty'
- 'Vanilla Gorilla'
- 'Roma'
- 'Hadspen Blood' (a hybrid crossed with Astrantia maxima)
- 'Shaggy' (previously 'Margey Fish')

== Gallery ==
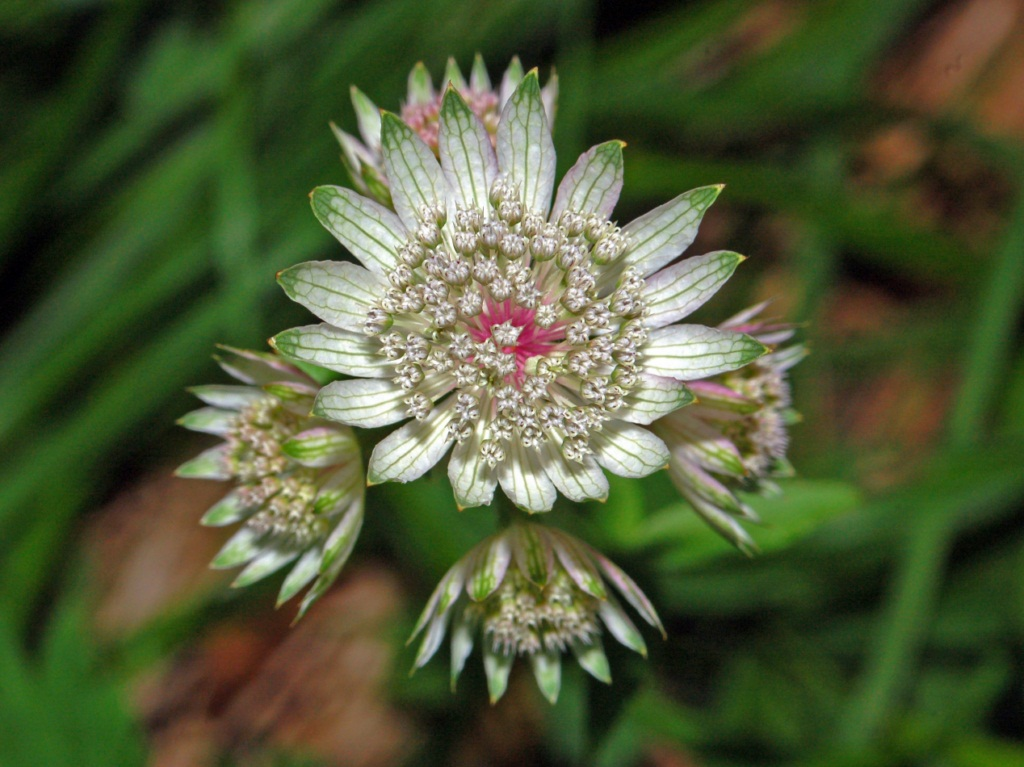

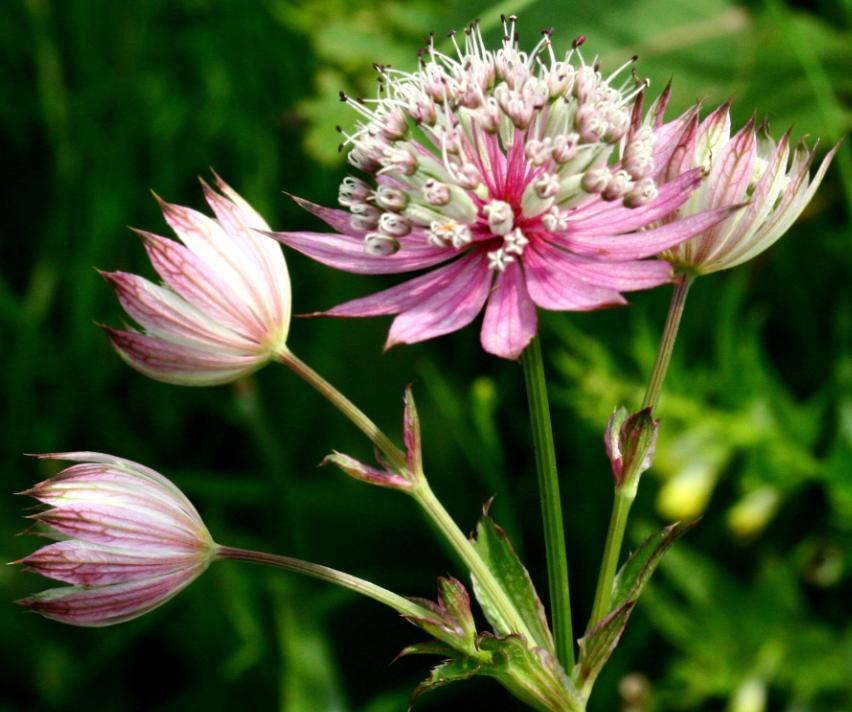

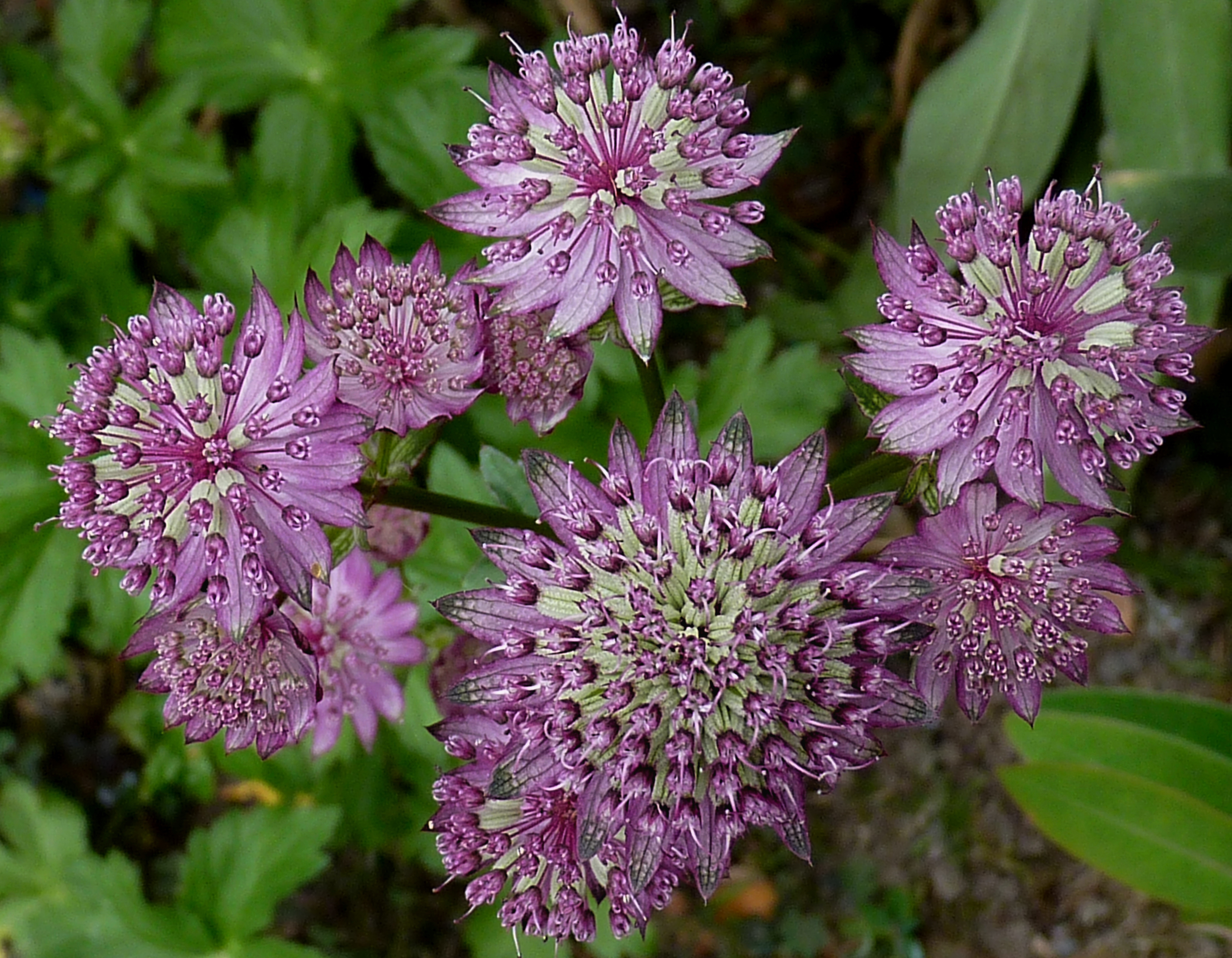
A. major 'Star of Beauty'

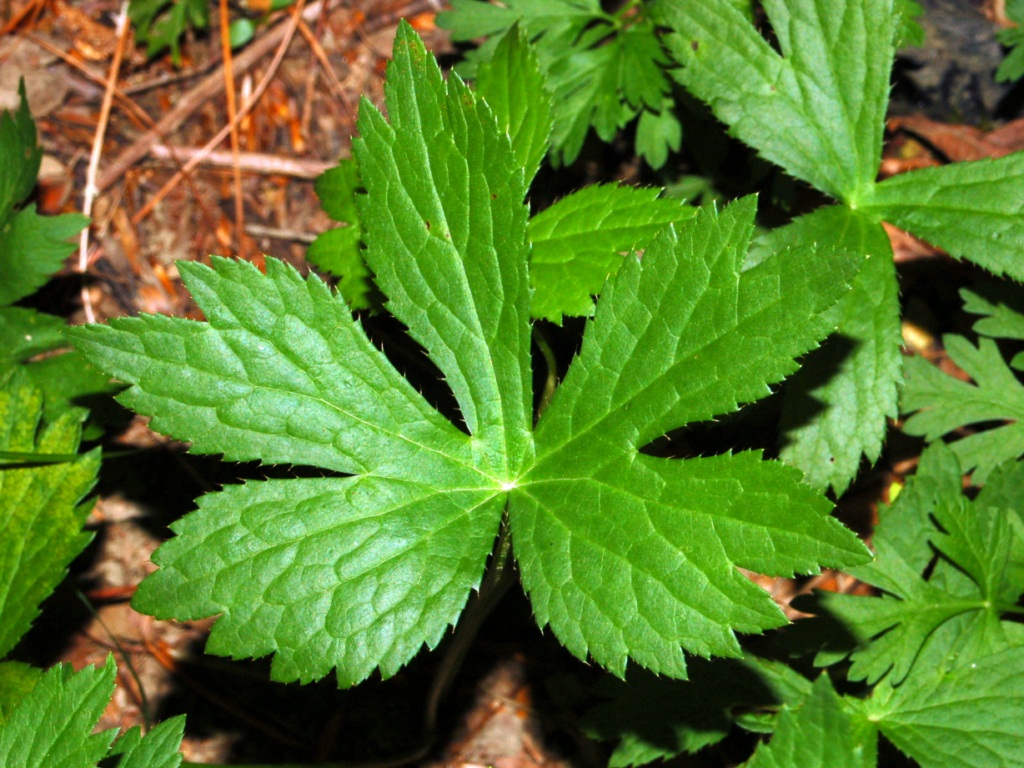
Leaf
