= Life zones of central Europe =

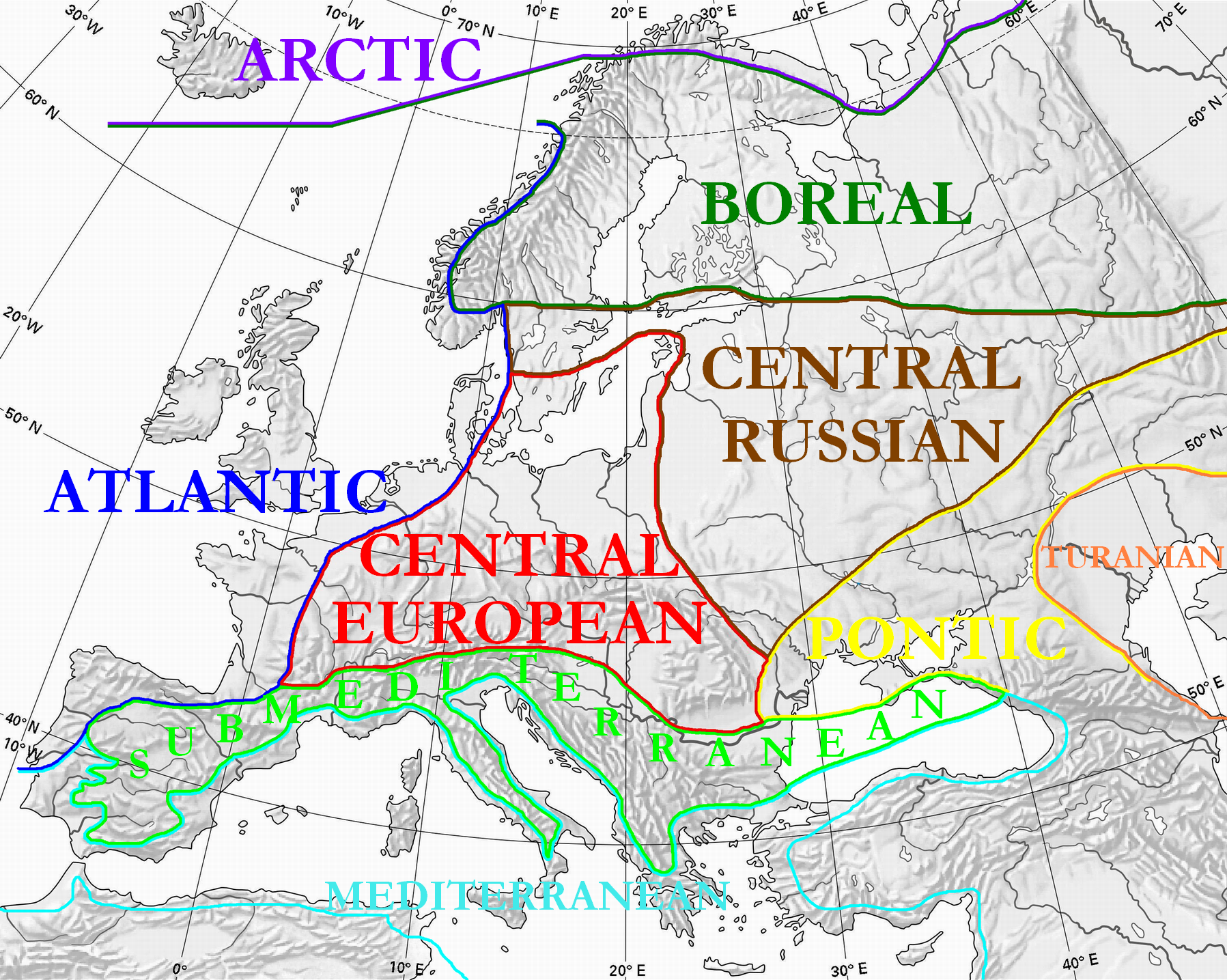
Floristic regions of Europe

Central Europe contains several life zones, depending on location and elevation.

Geographically, Central Europe lies between the Baltic Sea, the Apennine Peninsula, and the Balkan Peninsula. It includes the plains of Germany and Poland; the Alps; and the Carpathian Mountains. The Central European Flora region stretches from Central France to Central Romania and Southern Scandinavia. The lowlands of Central Europe contain the Central European mixed forests ecoregion, while the mountains host the Alps conifer and mixed forests and Carpathian montane conifer forests ecoregions.

An important factor in the local climate and ecology of Central Europe is the elevation: an increase of elevation by 1,000 metres (3,300 ft) causes the average air temperature to drop by 5 °C (9 °F) and decreases the amount of water that can be held by the atmosphere by 30%. This decrease in temperature and increase in rainfall result in altitudinal zonation, where the land can be divided into life zones of similar climate and ecology, depending on elevation.

== Life zones ==
Altitudinal zones of the Alps

The life zones of the Eastern and Central Alps are:

- Planar zone, under 300 m (East Alps), under 150 m (Central German hills), agriculture.
- Foothill zone, 300 – 800 m (East Alps), 150 – 300 m (Central German hills), oak limit (Quercus spp.). European beech (Fagus sylvatica), Sessile oak (Quercus petraea), Pedunculate oak or English oak (Quercus robur), European or common hornbeam (Carpinus betulus) and small-leaved Lime (Tilia cordata). Grape crop limit (Vitis spp.), around 600 m, Switzerland, North Side, South Slope, estimated 7.5 °C. Crops: maize for feed; sweet maize (Zea mays).
- Submontane zone, 700 - 1,000 m (East Alps), 300 – 450 m (Central German hills), European beech (Fagus sylvatica), Silver Fir or European Silver Fir (Abies alba) and Norway Spruce (Picea abies). Coniferous forests by reforestation limit around 800 m, North Side.
- Montane zone, 800 – 1,200 m (East Alps), 450 – 650 m (Central German hills), rye (Secale cereale) and wheat (Triticum spp.) crop limit.
- Mid-montane zone, 1,000 – 1,400 m (East Alps), 650 – 800 m (Central German hills). Limit of the whole year populated areas. Limit of a growing season of more than 100 days.
- Altimontane zone, 1,300 – 1,850 m (East Alps), 800 – 1,500 m (Central German hills). Deciduous forests limit, Sycamore Maple (Acer pseudoplatanus) and European beech (Fagus sylvatica).
- Subalpine zone, 1,500 – 2,500 m (East Alps), above 1,500 m (Central German hills), Scots Pine (Pinus sylvestris), Norway Spruce (Picea abies), Swiss Pine (Pinus cembra, Arve or Zirbel) limit and European Larch (Larix decidua) limit, 2,000 m, some specimens up to 2,850 m, South Slope. Tree line and Krummholz zone or ecotone (stunted subalpine bushes), Sub-alpine meadow and Alpine climate.
- Alpine zone, 2,000 - 3,000 m (East Alps), Montane grasslands and shrublands. Mountain Pine or Mugo Pine (Pinus mugo) limit. Alpine meadows just used in the warm season.
- Snow zone, above 3,000 m (East Alps), alpine desert, scree, permafrost and above snow line.

Roughly one quarter of the land lying between the summits of the Alps is available for cultivation. Of this low country, about one half may be vineyards and grain fields, while the remainder produces forage and grass. Of the high country, about half is utterly barren, consisting of snow fields, glaciers, bare rock, lakes and stream beds. The other half is divided between forest and pasture, and the product of this half largely supports the relatively large population. For a quarter of the year the flocks and herds are fed on the upper pastures, but the true limit of the wealth of a district is the number of animals that can be supported during the long winter, and while one part of the population is engaged in tending the beasts and in making cheese and butter, the remainder is busy cutting hay and storing up winter food for the cattle.

=== Submontane and montane zones ===
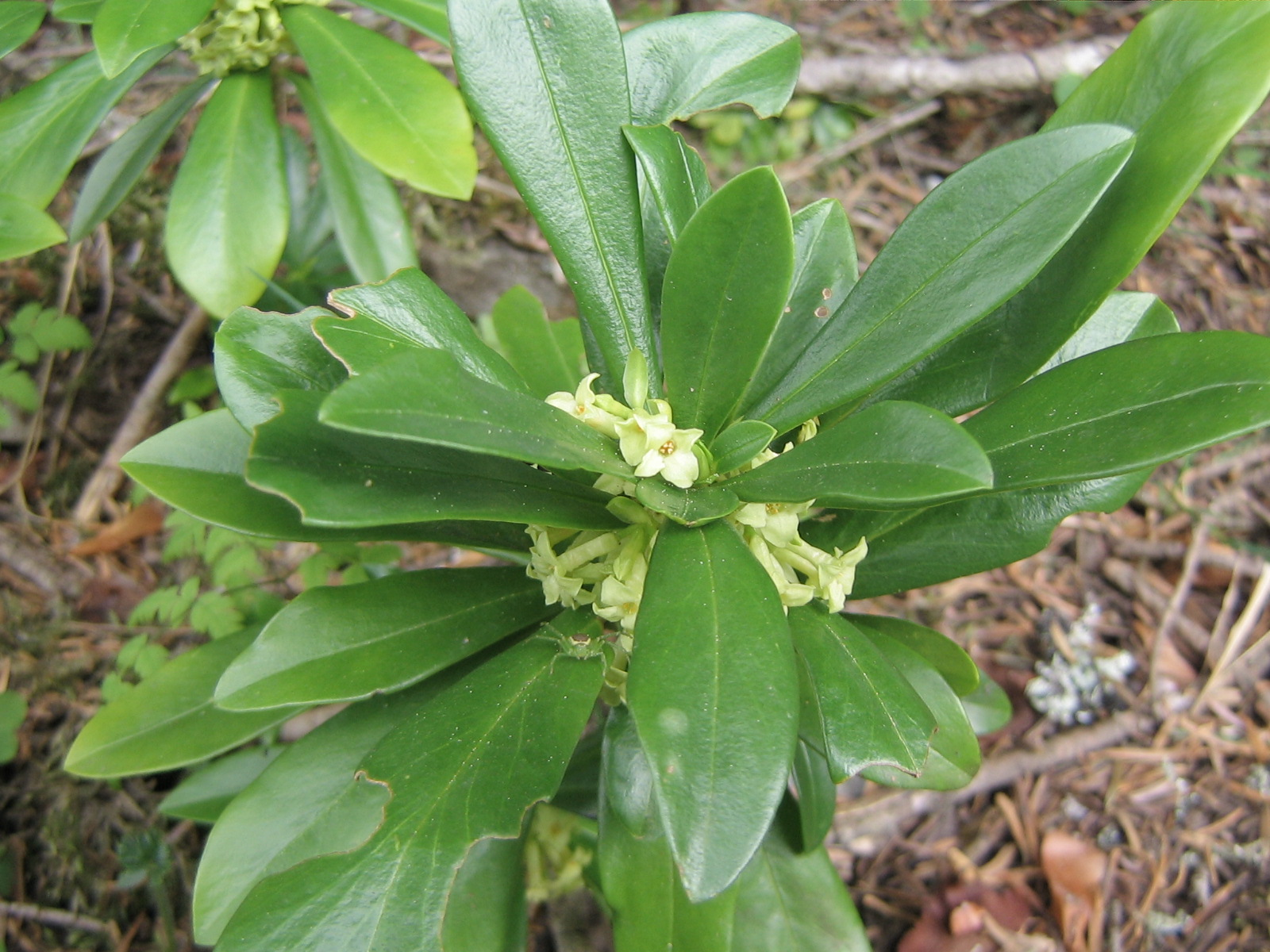
Daphne laureola

These zones contain both mixed beech-fir forests and hay meadows.

The beech forest occurs in the humid climates of the pre-Alps but disappears in the central massifs, which are drier and have a more continental climate. The forest is also found in the Southern Alps on north-facing slopes. The beech woods of the Alps are rarely pure and the beech is often found there associated with white fir (Abies alba), spruce (Picea abies) and various hardwoods such as the sycamore maple (Acer pseudoplatanus), and Norway maple (Acer platanoides).

The undergrowth in the mixed beech forest is home to shrubs such as mountain ash (Sorbus aucuparia), alpine laburnum (Laburnum alpinum), broad-leaved spindle (Euonymus latifolius) as well as small shrubby plants such as blueberry (Vaccinium myrtillus), heather (Calluna vulgaris), scorpion senna (Hippocrepis emerus), and Daphne laureola. Herbaceous plants in the forest include the wood sorrel (Oxalis acetosella), false lily of the valley (Maianthemum bifolium), liverwort (Hepatica nobilis), purple lettuce (Prenanthes purpurea), European goldenrod (Solidago virgaurea), sweet woodruff (Asperula odorata), Solomon's seal (Polygonatum multiflorum), and sanicle (Sanicula europaea).

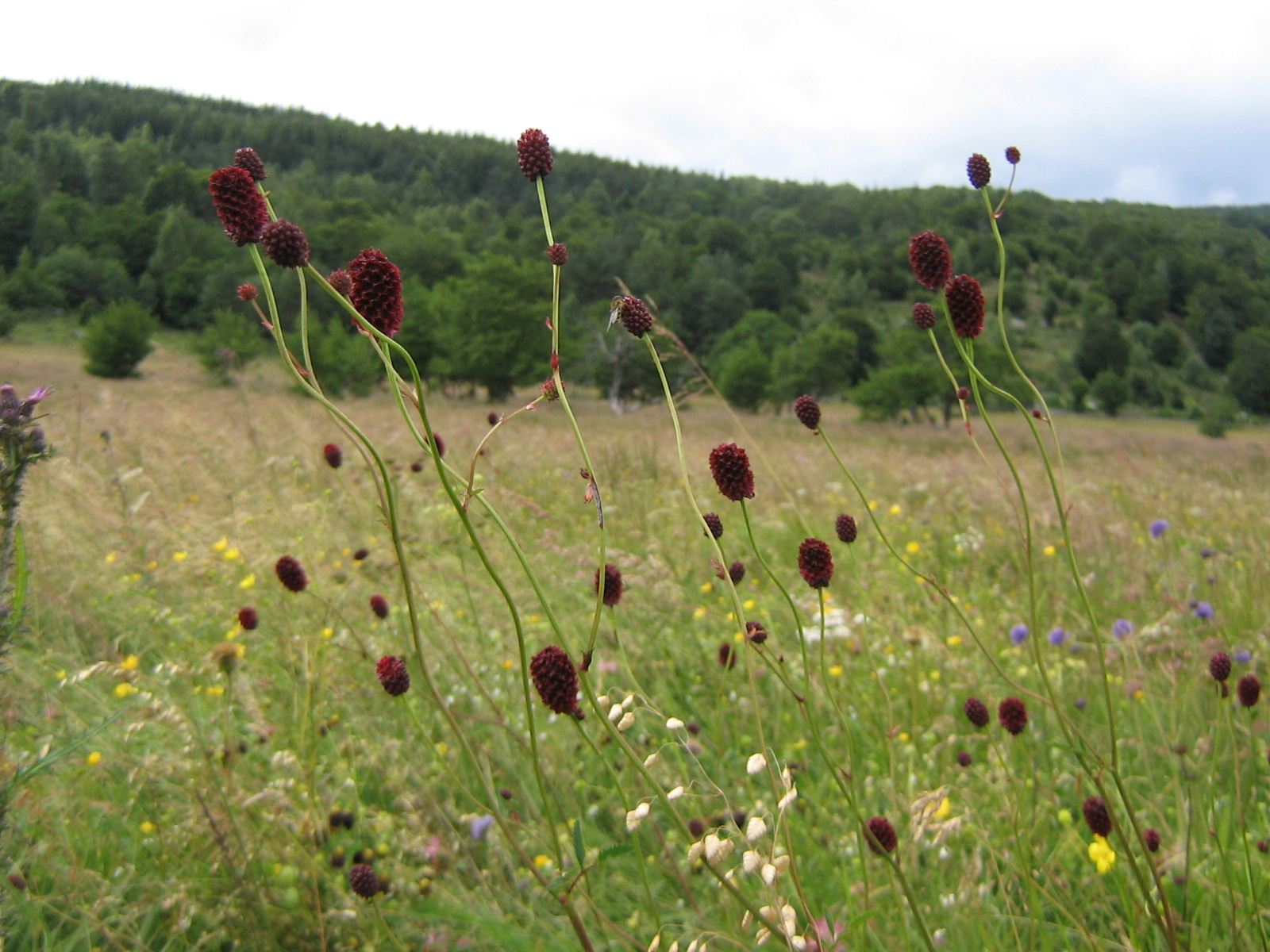
Great burnet (Sanguisorba officinalis)

The other common community in the montane zone is the hay meadow, which contains very rich flora. The meadows are predominated by grasses, such as tall oatgrass, cocksfoot, meadow foxtail, timothy grass, and bluegrass. The meadows also can contain species such as woodland geranium (Geranium sylvaticum), mountain buttercup (Ranunculus montanus), mountain clover (Trifolium montanum), great masterwort (Astrantia major), the columbine meadowrue (Thalictrum aquilegiifolium), Potentilla grandiflora, bearded bellflower (Campanula barbata), and poets' narcissus (Narcissus poeticus). At higher elevation, there are two plants whose leaves look alike: poisonous white hellebore (Veratrum album) and yellow gentian (Gentiana lutea). More arid meadows will contain rock rose, thyme, and mountain germander (Teucrium montanum). Very humid meadows will contain meadowsweet (Filipendula ulmaria), great burnet (Sanguisorba officinalis), the whorled lousewort (Pedicularis verticillata) accompanied by moisture-loving grasses such as Poa nemoralis and Molinia caerulea.

=== Subalpine zone ===
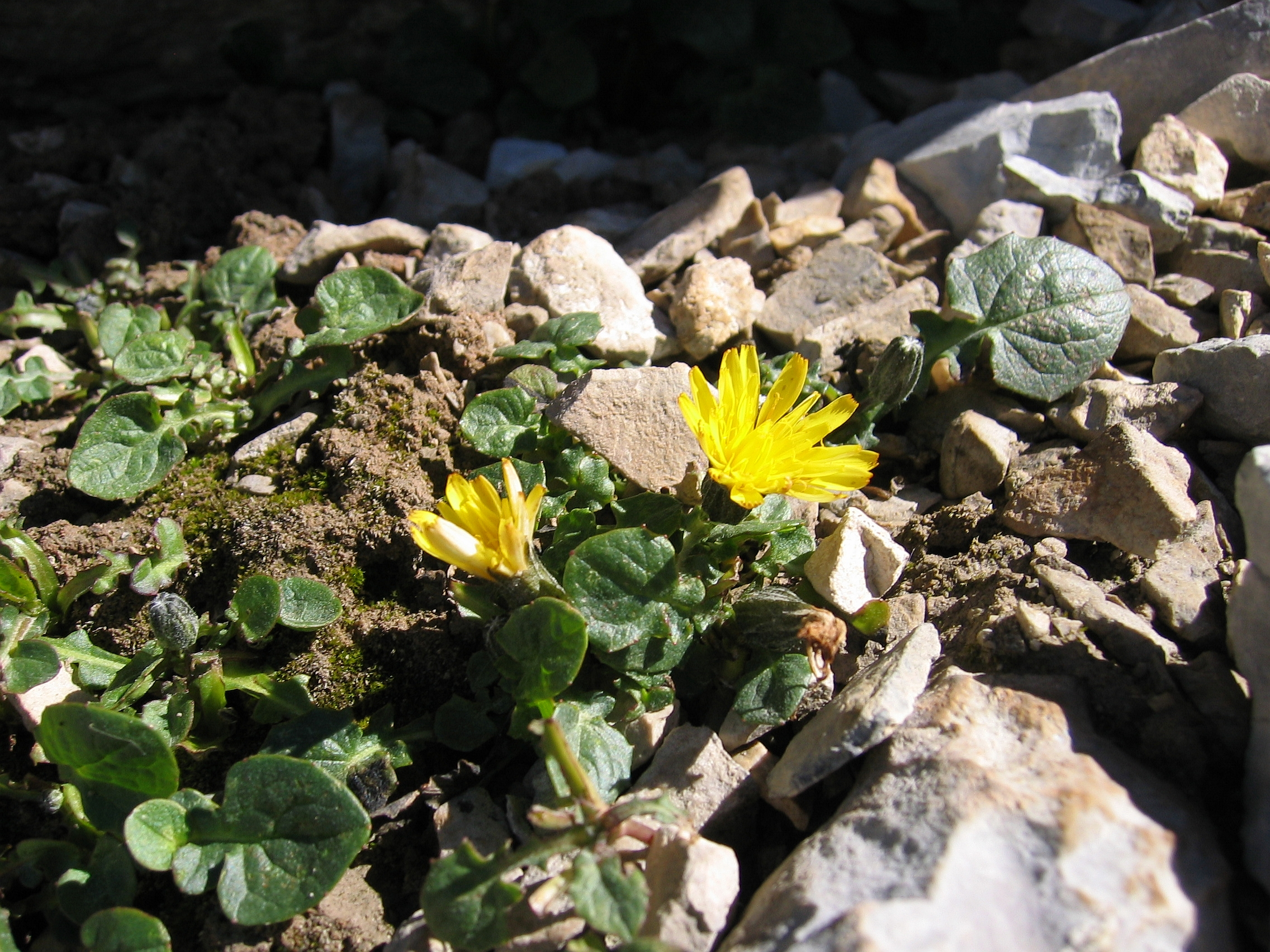
Crepis pygmaea, a plant that grows in scree

This zone includes various biological communities: scree, meadows, forests, wetlands.

==== Rocks and scree ====
The most characteristic plants on siliceous rock are Asplenium septentrionale and Primula hirsuta. Siliceous scree is also favorable to Chondrosea cotyledon, Phyteuma scheuchzeri, and Erysimum cheiri. Limestone scree hosts species such as Rumex scutatus, often accompanied in the central and eastern Alps by two remarkable species: Petasites paradoxus and Adenostyles glabra. In the western Alps, the most characteristic plant of this community is Crepis pygmaea.

Shady, damp scree is the preferred habitat of the green alder (Alnus alnobetula), which often forms inextricable thickets and helps stabilize the scree on steep slopes with its roots.

==== Meadows ====
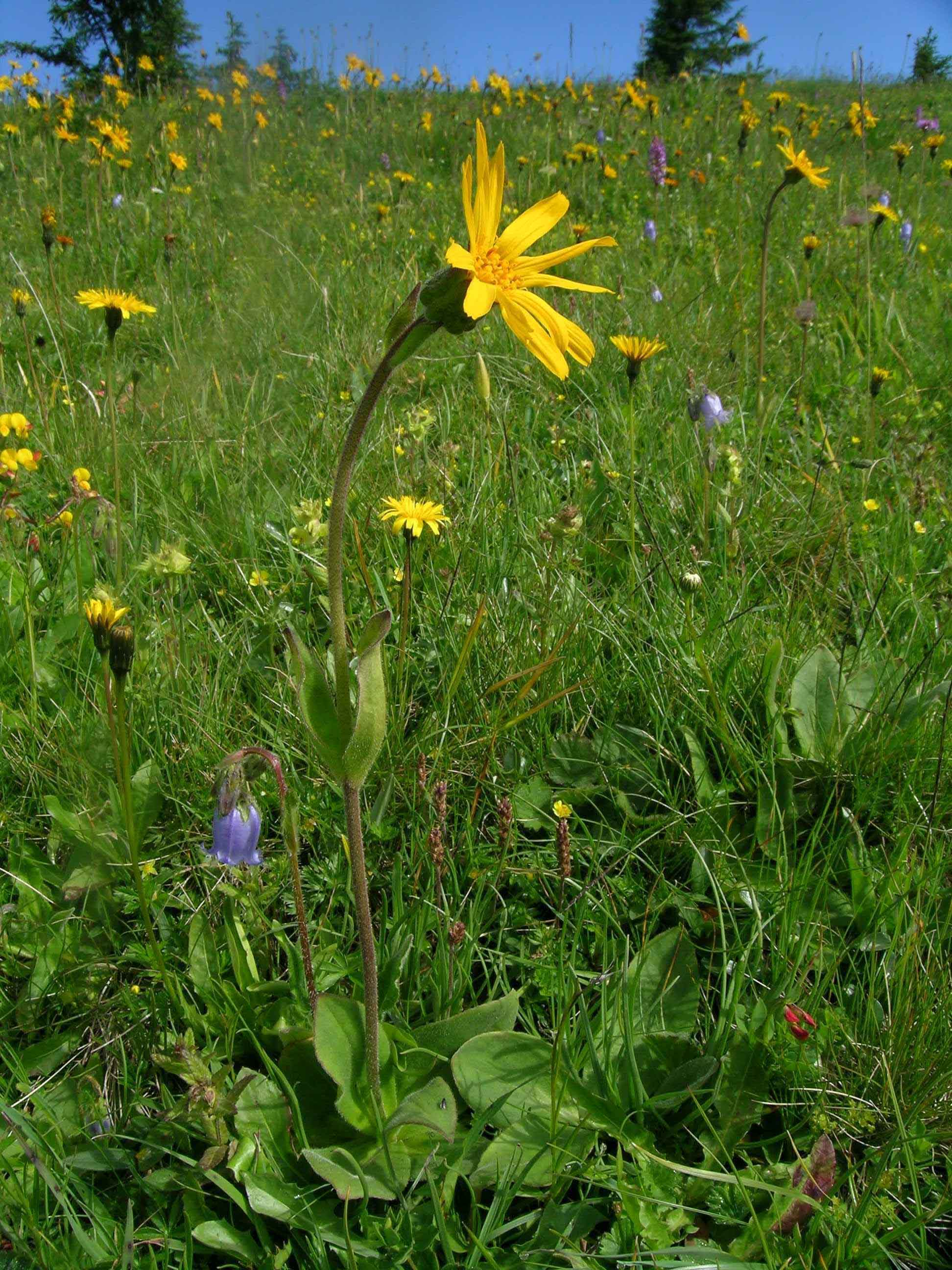
Typical alpine bellflower Campanula barbata

In the subalpine zone, meadows or pastures are almost all of human origin. The plant species present in this environment vary according to exposure, the nature of the soil, and the humidity of the climate. In general, mowing favors plants with bulbs that flower very early in the spring (crocuses) or very late (colchicums). The pastures, subjected to even stronger pressures, favor the emergence of tough species that the animals neglect, such as matgrass. This is often accompanied by mountain arnica or wolf's bane. Wet places are the domain of the megaphorbs, characterized by tall plants (Adenostyles alliariae, Cicerbita alpina, Aconitum napellus, Thalictrum aquilegiifolium, Delphinium elatum, etc.). Finally, in places where livestock stay for a long time, the abundantly smoky soil is very rich in nitrogen and is suitable for species such as Rumex alpinus, Chenopodium bonus-henricus, and Cirsium spinosissimum.

==== Forests ====
The subalpine forests in the Alps are mainly composed of four kinds of conifers: spruce, larch, Swiss pine, and mountain pine.

The spruce forest is found mainly in the lower part of the subalpine zone on siliceous or sometimes calcareous subsoil when the layer of humus is sufficiently thick and acidic. The flora of the spruce forests is limited, except for mosses. The most characteristic species are Oxalis acetosella, Moneses uniflora, Lycopodium annotinum, Listera cordata and two kinds of berries: Vaccinium myrtillus (European blueberry) and Vaccinium vitis-idaea (lingonberry).

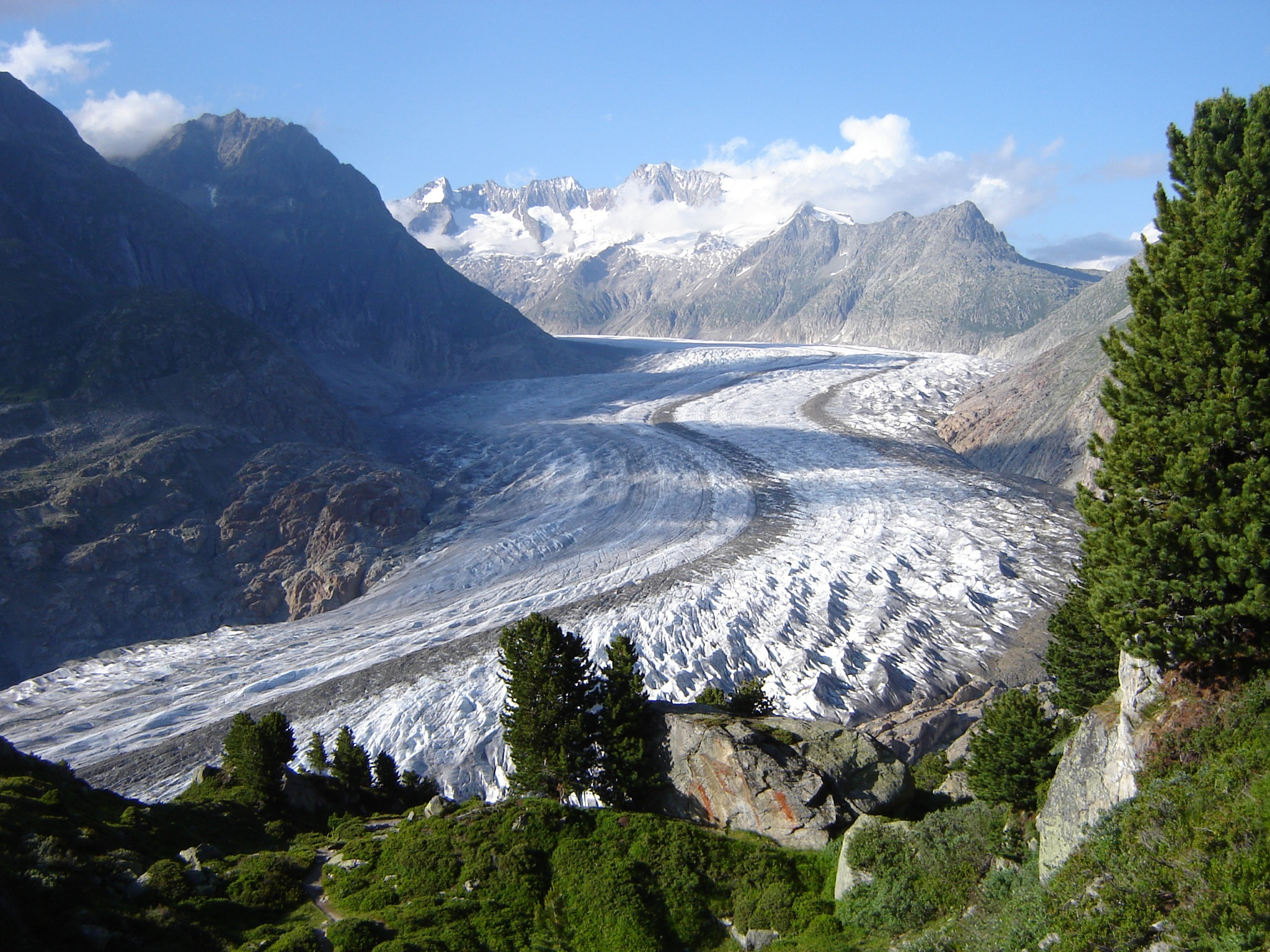
Swiss pines above the Aletsch Glacier in Switzerland

The Swiss pine and larch forests are found at higher elevations, and are more open, which allows a much more varied flora to thrive despite harsher climatic conditions. Larch has loses its needles in the cold season, which allows it to resist snow loads well. The Swiss pine keeps its needles but also resists the weight of the snow well because its branches are short and robust; it is particularly resistant to bad weather because it grows the highest in altitude, in inhospitable areas where no other tree can compete with it. Because of these very harsh living conditions, its growth is slow. Other plants in these forests include Homogyne alpina, Melampyrum sylvaticum, and the rare Linnaea borealis.

The mountain pine grows on thin soils which are not suitable for the other species. There are two subspecies: one that grows in the Western Alps and is commonly called hooked pine (Pinus mugo ssp. uncinata) and another in the Eastern Alps that is called reclining pine (Pinus mugo ssp. mugo). Both colonize steep slopes and scree and are accompanied by the winter heath (Erica carnea), Polygala chamaebuxus, Daphne striata, and alpine clematis (Clematis alpina).

=== Alpine zone ===
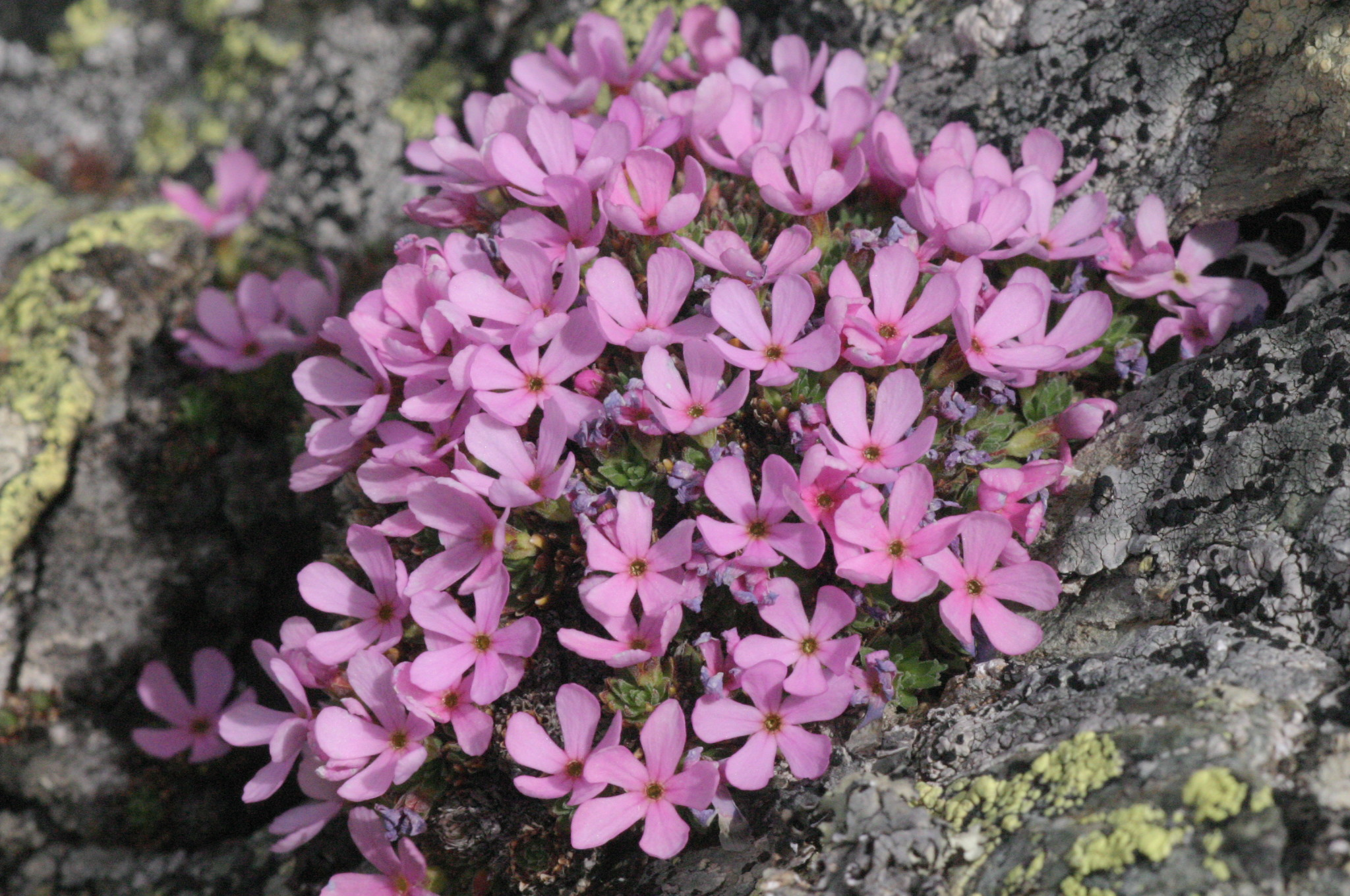
Androsace wulfeniana in the Austrian Alps

The Alps are eponymous of the alpine climate typical between the tree line up to the permanent snow line, roughly between 1,800 and 2,500 m (5,900 and 8,200 ft).

==== Rocks ====
The plants growing on the rocks must find their nutrients in the little soil accumulated in the cracks. In general, rocks are a very hostile environment for plants, with very large temperature differences and strong winds. The plants that grow there are forced to adapt in order to survive: they thus develop long and strong rootsto better resist the wind and to extract water from the dry soil. They tend to have leathery or waxy leaves to slow down transpiration. In addition, the chemical composition of the rock greatly influences the flora: the flowers of limestone rocks will be radically different from those found on granite. Plants typical of rocks often have rosette or pincushion structures, and often belong to genera such as Androsace, saxifrages, and houseleeks.

==== Scree ====
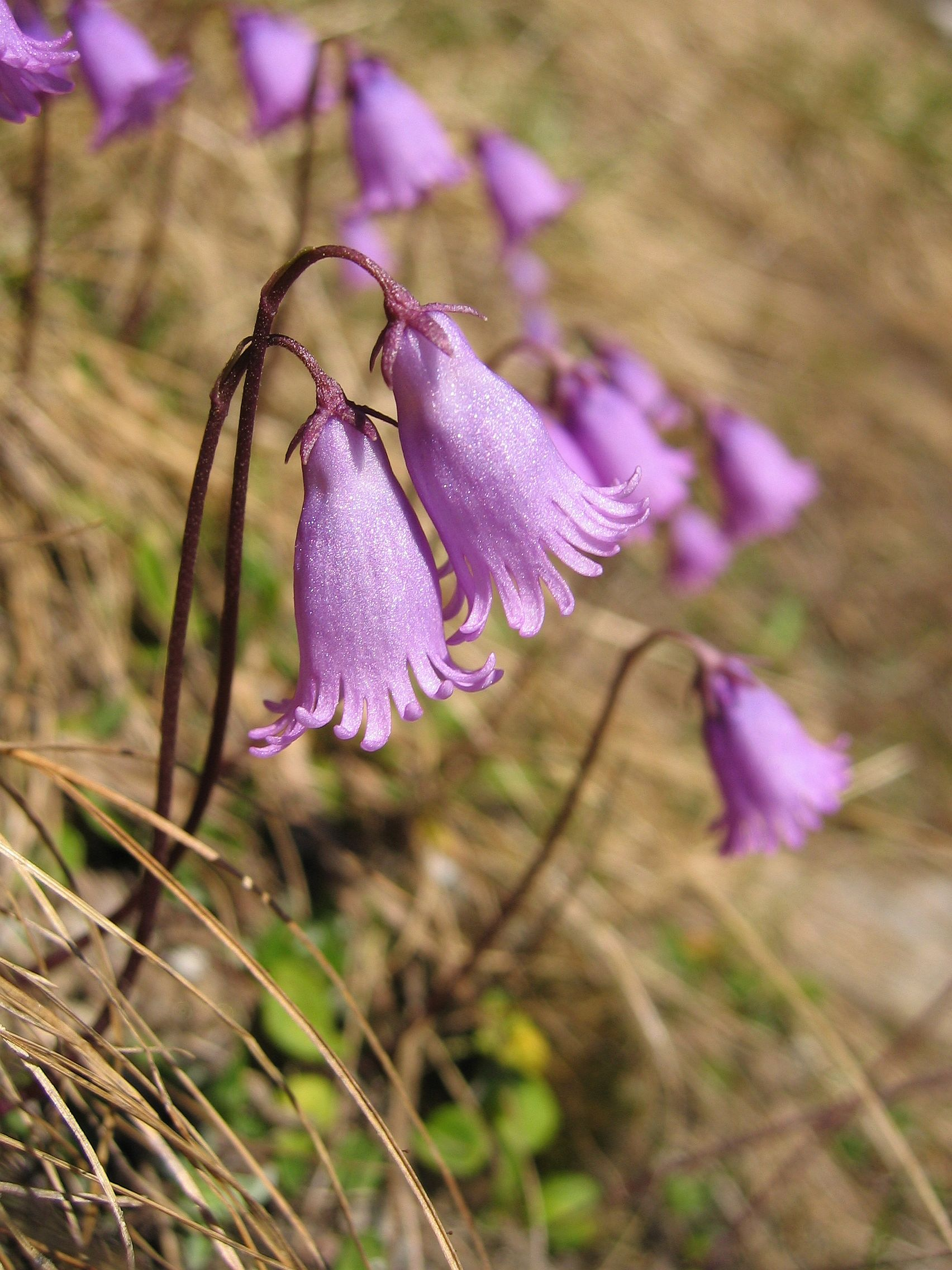
Soldanella pusilla

The scree is a much less hostile environment than the rocks because they retain more soil and moisture. The plants that grow there must, however, be adapted in certain cases to the movement of the rocks and must therefore be able to regenerate quickly in the event of partial destruction. These plants often have a branching, creeping, deeply rooted rhizome that allows them to produce stems at several points (Trisetum distichophyllum, Crepis pygmaea). Stabilized scree, especially those composed of small blocks that better hold the earth, generally evolves towards alpine meadows.

==== Snowbeds ====
Snowbeds lie in sheltered depressions, with little sunshine, where the snow remains for a long time. Snowbeds are characterized by a moist and humus-rich soil favorable to vegetation, but only for a very short period of the year (e.g., 2 months). The characteristic plants of this environment are dwarf or creeping plants that propagate vegetatively. Salix herbacea, Veronica alpina, Taraxacum alpinum, and Soldanella pusilla are adapted to these cold depressions.

==== Alpine meadows ====
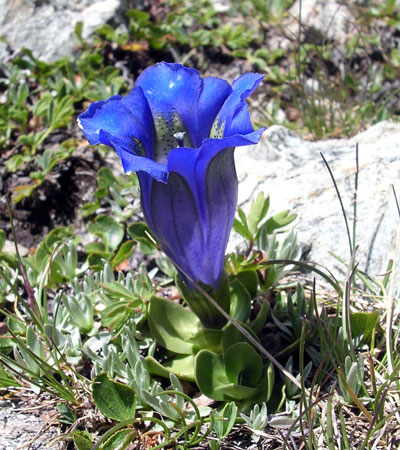
Alpine gentian (Gentiana alpina)

These meadows are characterized by a continuous vegetation cover that are very rich in species and dominated by grasses and sedges. There are a large number of different types of meadows depending on the geographical location and the nature of the soil. The grass Sesleria caerulea and the sedge Carex firma dominate meadows on dry calcareous soil. On more humid calcareous soil, Carex ferruginea or Festuca violacea occur frequently. These dominant plants are accompanied by typically alpine plants such as gentians (e.g., Gentiana clusii, Gentiana terglouensis), the alpine milkvetch, and many more.

The species richness on siliceous soil is as high as limestone soil. In dry and well-exposed places, meadows with Festuca varia or Festuca spadicea will be found . Above 2,000 to 2,500 metres (6,600 to 8,200 ft), the most characteristic species is Carex curvula accompanied by showy species such as Gentiana punctata, Gentiana alpina or Rhododendron ferrugineum.

=== Glacial zone ===
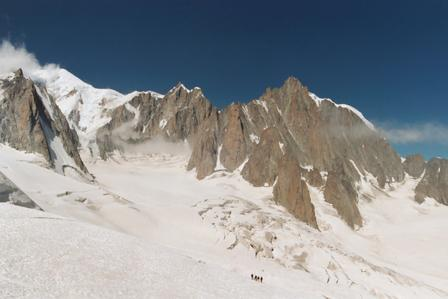
Scenery typical of the glacial regions of the Alps

On the higher parts of lofty mountains in the Alps, more snow falls in each year than melts. A portion of this is carried away by the wind before it is consolidated, but a large portion accumulates in hollows and depressions of the surface and is gradually converted into glacier ice which descends by slowly flowing into the deeper valleys where it help swell perennial streams.

Mountain snow does not lie in beds of uniform thickness and some parts are more exposed to the sun and warm air than others. Beds of snow commonly alternate with exposed slopes covered with brilliant vegetation without an obvious boundary of perpetual snow. A seemingly clear boundary seems visible when a high mountain chain is viewed from a distance: Similar conditions are repeated at many different points, so that the level at which large snow beds show themselves can be seen as approximately horizontal. But this is true only as far as the conditions are similar. On the opposite sides of the same chain the exposure to the sun or to warm winds may cause a wide difference in the level of permanent snow, though the increased fall of snow on the side exposed to moist winds may more than compensate for the sun's rays.

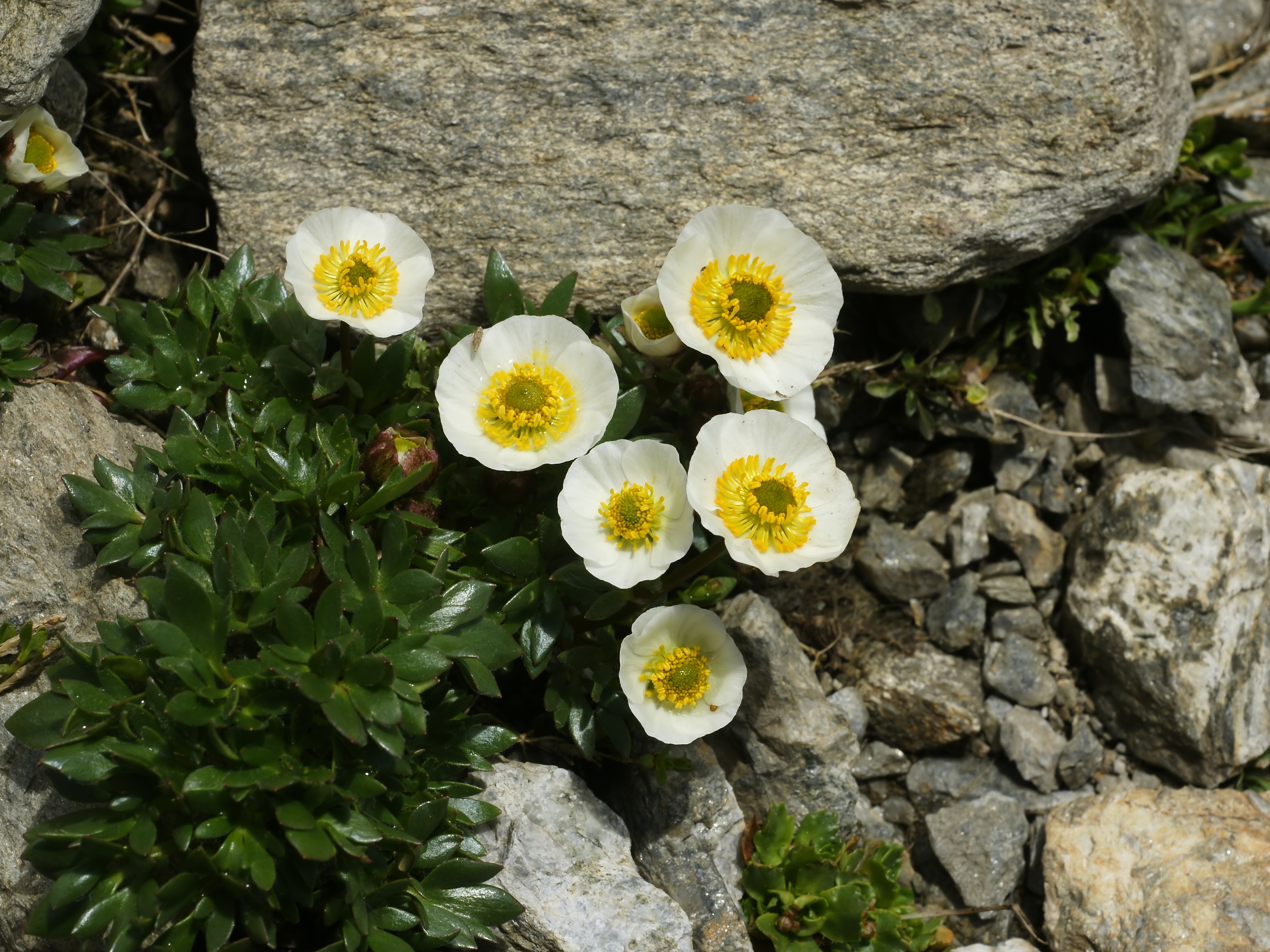
Ranunculus glacialis

Still, the "line of perpetual snow" is not fixed. The occurrence of favorable meteorological conditions during several successive seasons may and does increase the extent of the snowfields and lower the limit of seemingly permanent snow, while the opposite may cause the limit to rise higher on the flanks of the mountains. Attempts to fix accurately the level of perpetual snow in the Alps are difficult. Local accuracy might be established for a particular district. In some parts of the Alps, the limit is about 2,400 m (7,900 ft) elevation, while in others it cannot be placed much below 2,900 m (9,500 ft). As very little snow remains on rocks angled more than 60°, this is soon removed by the wind, some steep masses of rock remain bare even near the summits of the highest peaks, but as almost every spot offering the least hold for vegetation is covered with snow, few flowering plants are seen above 3,550 m (11,650 ft).

Given the extremely harsh climatic conditions of this zone, few plant species can find a favorable environment to thrive. A few high altitude plants, however, manage to grow in certain crevices of rocks sometimes at very high altitudes. A specimen of glacier buttercup was found at the top of the Finsteraarhorn at an altitude of more than 4,200 metres (13,800 ft) In the glacial zone, the species distribution is very different between calcareous and siliceous rocks. On limestone rock, we can find Androsace helvetica, saxifrages, Athamanta cretensis, and Draba tomentosa. On siliceous rock, one will come across Androsace vandellii, two characteristic species of houseleek (Sempervivum montanum and Sempervivum arachnoideum), and various saxifrages (e.g., Saxifraga aspera).

== Climate ==
The effect of elevation on climate is evident when comparing climate normals as a function of elevation in Switzerland:

	Approx. coordinates of the weather station	Elevation	Precipitation	Annual Mean Temperature	Mean Jan Low Temperature	Mean July High Temperature
Weissfluhjoch	46°50′00″N 9°48′23″E	2,691 m	1,439 mm	-1.5 °C	-10.4 °C	10.2 °C
Pilatus	46°58′48″N 8°15′13″E	2,106 m	1,791 mm	2.3 °C	-6.5 °C	12.6 °C
Napf	47°00′14″N 7°56′23″E	1,404 m	1,649 mm	5.7 °C	-3.8 °C	18.0 °C
Engelberg	46°49′N 8°25′E	1,036 m	1,568 mm	6.8 °C	-5.3 °C	21.0 °C
Buchs-Suhr	47°23′N 8°05′E	387 m	920 mm	10.0 °C	-1.5 °C	25.6 °C

== See also ==
- Climate of the Alps
- Life zones of the Mediterranean region
