= Anchinia laureolella =

Scientific classification
- Domain: Eukaryota
- Kingdom: Animalia
- Phylum: Arthropoda
- Class: Insecta
- Order: Lepidoptera
- Family: Oecophoridae
- Genus: Anchinia
- Species: A. laureolella

Binomial name
- Anchinia laureolella Herrich-Schaffer, 1854

Species of moth

Anchinia laureolella is a species of moth of the family Depressariidae. It is found in Spain, France, Switzerland, Austria, Italy, Slovenia, Hungary, Bulgaria, North Macedonia, Greece, Iran and Afghanistan.

The larvae feed on Daphne striata.

== Subspecies ==
- Anchinia laureolella laureolella
- Anchinia laureolella iranica Lvovsky, 1997 (Iran)
- Anchinia laureolella afghanica Lvovsky, 1997 (south-eastern Afghanistan)
