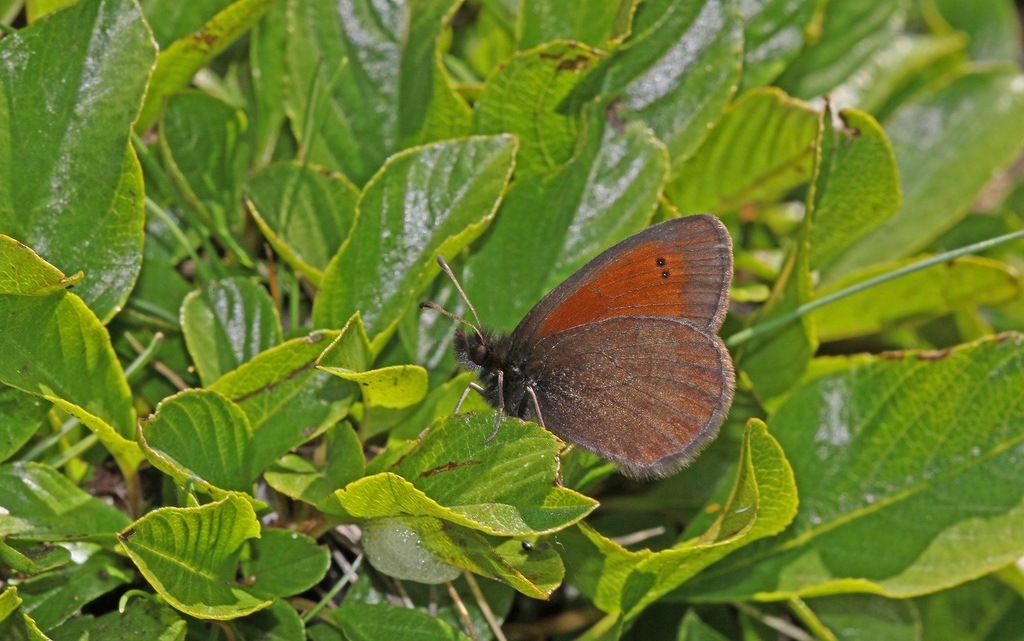

Scientific classification
- Kingdom: Animalia
- Phylum: Arthropoda
- Clade: Pancrustacea
- Class: Insecta
- Order: Lepidoptera
- Family: Nymphalidae
- Genus: Erebia
- Species: E. mnestra

Binomial name
- Erebia mnestra (Hübner, 1804)

= Mnestra's ringlet =

Species of butterfly

Mnestra's ringlet (Erebia mnestra) is a member of the subfamily Satyrinae of the family Nymphalidae. It is a mountain butterfly found in the Alps of Austria, France, Italy and Switzerland. The Mnestra's ringlet is named for Mnestra, a daughter of Erysichthon, king of Thessaly in Greek mythology.

== Description in Seitz ==
E. mnestra Hbn. (36 c, d). Shape as in melampus, but larger. The band on the forewing of the male is reddish or brownish yellow and distally sharply defined, proximally more or less shading off into the black-brown ground-colour. In this band there are sometimes 2 small black pupils near the apex, which are mostly absent. The hindwing has sometimes a brown band separated by the veins into 3-4 spots, which may be absent. The forewing beneath is russet-brown, the costal and distal margins being dark brown like the hindwing. The female is somewhat lighter in colour, the band of the forewing is russet-yellow and on both sides sharply limited, bearing 2 usually white-centred ocelli, which are visible also on the underside. Specimens in which the band is especially prominent bear in the same 2—3 small black ocelli with white centres. The band, however, is mostly absent, being represented only by some diffuse brown spots. Underside of the forewing as in the male, but the band lighter, and the wing russet-brown from the band to the base. The hindwing beneath light brown, dusted all over with yellowish grey atoms, the wing being centrally crossed by a but slightly lighter band, which is somewhat dentate on both sides. Antenna black above, white beneath. In the Swiss and Tyrolese Alps, but local. — gorgophone Bell., from South France, is smaller and has a broader band.
