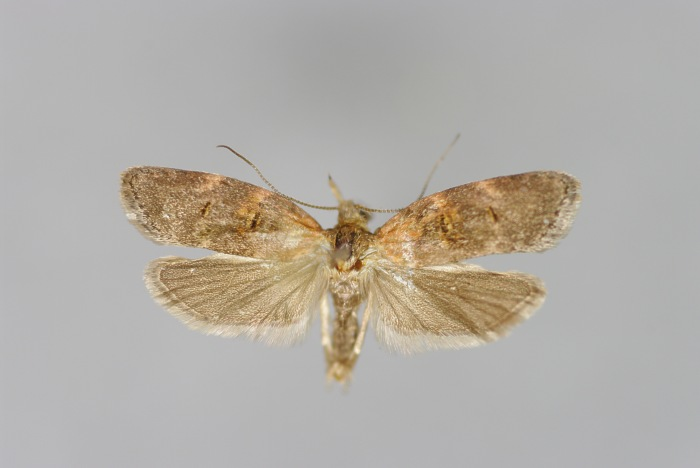
- Anchinia cristalis

Scientific classification
- Kingdom: Animalia
- Phylum: Arthropoda
- Clade: Pancrustacea
- Class: Insecta
- Order: Lepidoptera
- Family: Oecophoridae
- Subfamily: Oecophorinae
- Genus: Anchinia; Hübner, 1818

Type species
- Tinea verrucella Denis & Schiffermüller, 1775

Species
- Numerous, see text

Synonyms
- Fugia Duponchel, [1846]; Palpula Kollar, 1832

= Anchinia =

Genus of moths

Anchinia is a genus of gelechioid moths.

== Taxonomy ==
In some systematic layouts, it is placed in the subfamily Amphisbatinae of the concealer moth family (Oecophoridae). Delimitation of Amphisbatinae versus the closely related Depressariinae and Oecophorinae is a major problem of Gelechioidea taxonomy and systematics, and some authors separate the former two as full-blown families (Amphisbatidae and Depressariidae), and/or include the Amphisbatinae in Depressariinae (or Depressariidae), or merge them in the Oecophorinae outright.

== Species ==
The species of Anchinia are:

- Anchinia cristalis (Scopoli, 1763)
- Anchinia daphnella (Denis & Schiffermuller, 1775)
- Anchinia furculata Meyrick, 1925
- Anchinia grandis Stainton, 1867
- Anchinia grisescens Frey, 1856
- Anchinia laureolella Herrich-Schaffer, 1854
- Anchinia oenochares Meyrick, 1924
- Anchinia orientalis Caradja, 1939
- Anchinia porphyritica Meyrick, 1914
