= Anchinia orientalis =

Scientific classification
- Domain: Eukaryota
- Kingdom: Animalia
- Phylum: Arthropoda
- Class: Insecta
- Order: Lepidoptera
- Family: Oecophoridae
- Genus: Anchinia
- Species: A. orientalis

Binomial name
- Anchinia orientalis Caradja, 1939

Species of moth

Anchinia orientalis is a moth in the family Depressariidae. It was described by Aristide Caradja in 1939. It is found in Shanxi, China.
