= Anchinia furculata =

Scientific classification
- Kingdom: Animalia
- Phylum: Arthropoda
- Class: Insecta
- Order: Lepidoptera
- Family: Oecophoridae
- Genus: Anchinia
- Species: A. furculata

Binomial name
- Anchinia furculata Meyrick, 1925

Species of moth

Anchinia furculata is a moth in the family Depressariidae. It was described by Edward Meyrick in 1925. It is found in South Africa, where it has been recorded from KwaZulu-Natal.

The wingspan is about 23 mm. The forewings are whitish, irregularly sprinkled with purplish grey, with some black scales, the median third is faintly rosy tinged. There is a faint ferruginous tinge beneath the costa towards the base and there are seven cloudy spots of dark purplish-brown suffusion on the costa between one-fourth and the apex, these are darker and more defined posteriorly. A transverse black linear mark is found in the disc at two-fifths, sending posteriorly from its upper extremity a similar longitudinal mark. There is also an irregular partly transverse and partly longitudinal blackish spot in the discal two-thirds, with some brownish tinge above it. A subcostal series of several indistinct longitudinal marks of purple-brown and dark fuscous scales is found on the median third and there are two faint transverse shades of purplish-grey sprinkles posteriorly, somewhat bent above the middle. A marginal series of blackish marks is found around the apex and termen. The hindwings are pale grey, whitish tinged towards the base.
