= Anchinia oenochares =

Scientific classification
- Kingdom: Animalia
- Phylum: Arthropoda
- Clade: Pancrustacea
- Class: Insecta
- Order: Lepidoptera
- Family: Oecophoridae
- Genus: Anchinia
- Species: A. oenochares

Binomial name
- Anchinia oenochares Meyrick, 1924

Species of moth

Anchinia oenochares is a moth in the family Depressariidae. It was described by Edward Meyrick in 1924. It is found in South Africa and Zimbabwe.

The wingspan is 15–17 mm. The forewings are white, with some scattered grey, purplish, and dark fuscous scales and a short slender streak of ferruginous suffusion from the base beneath the costa, as well as some grey sprinkles along the anterior half of the costa, and a darker grey oblique spot at one-fourth. The first plical stigma is round, grey, and sprinkled with blackish, the plical linear, rather before this and there is a purplish fascia suffusedly sprinkled with dark grey or dark fuscous from the middle of the costa to the middle of the dorsum, slightly angulated near the costa, interrupted in the middle by a blotch of ferruginous suffusion. A purplish fascia, suffusedly sprinkled with dark fuscous from three-fourths of the costa to near the dorsum before the tornus, is dilated posteriorly towards the costa, and preceded in the middle by a ferruginous spot. The terminal area beyond this is suffused with ferruginous rosy and there is a marginal series of blackish dots around the posterior part of the costa and termen. The hindwings are pale grey, with the veins grey.
