= Anchinia porphyritica =

Scientific classification
- Kingdom: Animalia
- Phylum: Arthropoda
- Class: Insecta
- Order: Lepidoptera
- Family: Oecophoridae
- Genus: Anchinia
- Species: A. porphyritica

Binomial name
- Anchinia porphyritica Meyrick, 1914

Species of moth

Anchinia porphyritica is a moth in the family Depressariidae. It was described by Edward Meyrick in 1914. It is found in Assam, India.

The wingspan is about 18 mm. The forewings are white, with a faint rosy tinge, irregularly sprinkled or mixed with pale ochreous and fuscous and with the basal half irregularly clouded with light ochreous and pale purplish. There is a fuscous spot on the costa at one-third, preceded and followed by whitish, and some irregular dark fuscous markings in the disc beneath it representing the anterior stigmata. There is a triangular dark purplish-fuscoua patch on the costa beyond the middle, its apex reaching a raised blackish spot representing the second discal stigma, and extended as a brownish streak to a small blackish spot on the dorsum before the tornus. There is some brownish suffusion along the costa posteriorly, and a small dark purplish-fuscous spot at four-fifths, as well as a terminal series of large blackish dots. The hindwings are light greyish ochreous.
