= Anchinia grandis =

Scientific classification
- Kingdom: Animalia
- Phylum: Arthropoda
- Clade: Pancrustacea
- Class: Insecta
- Order: Lepidoptera
- Family: Oecophoridae
- Genus: Anchinia
- Species: A. grandis

Binomial name
- Anchinia grandis Stainton, 1867

Species of moth

Anchinia grandis is a species of moth of the family Depressariidae. It is found in Italy, Turkey, Dagestan and Georgia.
