= Anchinia daphnella =

Scientific classification
- Kingdom: Animalia
- Phylum: Arthropoda
- Clade: Pancrustacea
- Class: Insecta
- Order: Lepidoptera
- Family: Oecophoridae
- Genus: Anchinia
- Species: A. daphnella

Binomial name
- Anchinia daphnella (Denis & Schiffermuller, 1775)

Synonyms
- Tinea daphnella Denis & Schiffermuller, 1775; Tinea pudorella Hübner, 1793; Anchinia daphnella orientella Krulikovsky, 1909

Species of moth

Anchinia daphnella is a species of moth of the family Depressariidae. It is found in most of Europe, except the Iberian Peninsula, Great Britain, Ireland, the Benelux and Greece. In the east, the range extends to the eastern part of the Palearctic realm.

The wingspan is 23–26 mm.

The larvae feed on Daphne mezereum.
