= County flowers of Norway =

List of flowers in Norway

A list of county flowers of Norway.

County	Image	Norwegian name	Scientific name
Akershus	Hepatica nobilis	Blåveis	Hepatica nobilis
Aust-Agder	Lonicera periclymenum	Vivendel	Lonicera periclymenum
Buskerud	Nymphaea alba	Stor nøkkerose	Nymphaea alba
Finnmark	Rubus chamaemorus	Molte	Rubus chamaemorus
Hedmark	Epilobium angustifolium	Geitrams	Epilobium angustifolium
Hordaland	Primula-vulgaris	Kusymre	Primula vulgaris
Møre og Romsdal	Saxifraga cotyledon	Bergfrue	Saxifraga cotyledon
Nord-Trøndelag	Cypripedium calceolus	Marisko	Cypripedium calceolus
Nordland	Saxifraga oppositifolia	Rødsildre	Saxifraga oppositifolia
Oppland	Pulsatilla vernalis	Mogop	Pulsatilla vernalis
Oslo	Trifolium montanum	Bakkekløver	Trifolium montanum
Rogaland	Erica tetralix	Klokkelyng	Erica tetralix
Sogn og Fjordane	Digitalis purpurea	Revebjelle	Digitalis purpurea
Sør-Trøndelag	Dryas octopetala	Reinrose	Dryas octopetala
Telemark	Dactylorhiza sambucina	Søstermarihand	Dactylorhiza sambucina
Troms	Trollius europaeus	Ballblom	Trollius europaeus
Vest-Agder	Quercus robur	Sommereik	Quercus robur
Vestfold	Fagus sylvatica	Bøk	Fagus sylvatica
Østfold	Convallaria majalis	Liljekonvall	Convallaria majalis
