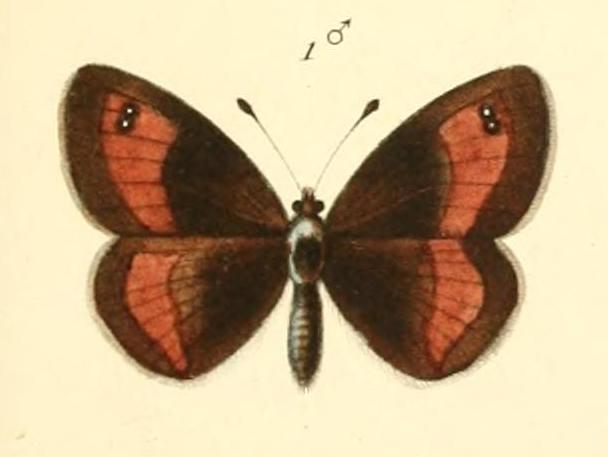
- Erebia aethiopellus, male

Scientific classification
- Kingdom: Animalia
- Phylum: Arthropoda
- Class: Insecta
- Order: Lepidoptera
- Family: Nymphalidae
- Genus: Erebia
- Species: E. aethiopellus

Binomial name
- Erebia aethiopellus (Hoffmannsegg, 1806)

= False Mnestra ringlet =

Species of butterfly

The false Mnestra ringlet (Erebia aethiopellus) is a butterfly of the family Nymphalidae found in France and Italy (Alps).

The wingspan is 18–20 mm. The ground colour is dark brown butterfly. There is an orange postdiscal band adorned with two ocelli with white pupils on the forewing. These are more or less marked according to the individuals. Adults are on wing from July to August.

The larvae feed on Festuca paniculata. The species overwinters in the larval stage.
