= Anchinia grisescens =

Scientific classification
- Kingdom: Animalia
- Phylum: Arthropoda
- Class: Insecta
- Order: Lepidoptera
- Family: Oecophoridae
- Genus: Anchinia
- Species: A. grisescens

Binomial name
- Anchinia grisescens Frey, 1856

Synonyms
- Anchinia dolomiella Mann & Rogenhofer, 1877; Anchinia austriaca Frey, 1882

Species of moth

Anchinia grisescens is a species of moth of the family Depressariidae. It is found in France, Switzerland, Austria and Italy.
