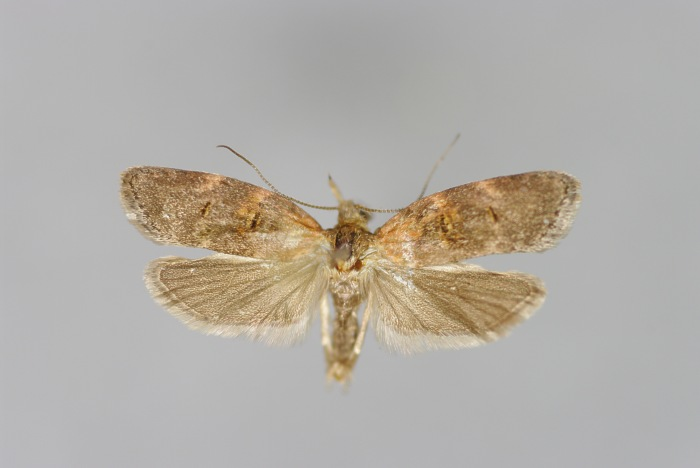

Scientific classification
- Kingdom: Animalia
- Phylum: Arthropoda
- Clade: Pancrustacea
- Class: Insecta
- Order: Lepidoptera
- Family: Oecophoridae
- Genus: Anchinia
- Species: A. cristalis

Binomial name
- Anchinia cristalis (Scopoli, 1763)

Synonyms
- Phalaena cristalis Scopoli, 1763; Tinea verrucella Denis & Schiffermüller, 1775; Tinea hepaticella Hübner, 1796; Tinea cneorella Hübner, [1810]; Anchinia cristalis kuriliensis Lvovsky, 1990

= Anchinia cristalis =

Species of moth

Anchinia cristalis is a species of moth of the family Depressariidae. It is found in most of Europe (except most of the Balkan Peninsula, Portugal, Great Britain, Ireland, the Netherlands, Norway, Finland, and Ukraine) east to the eastern parts of the Palearctic realm.

The wingspan is 14–19 mm. Adults are on wing from late May to early July.

The larvae live between spun leaves of Thymelaea passerina, Daphne mezereum and Daphne laureola.
