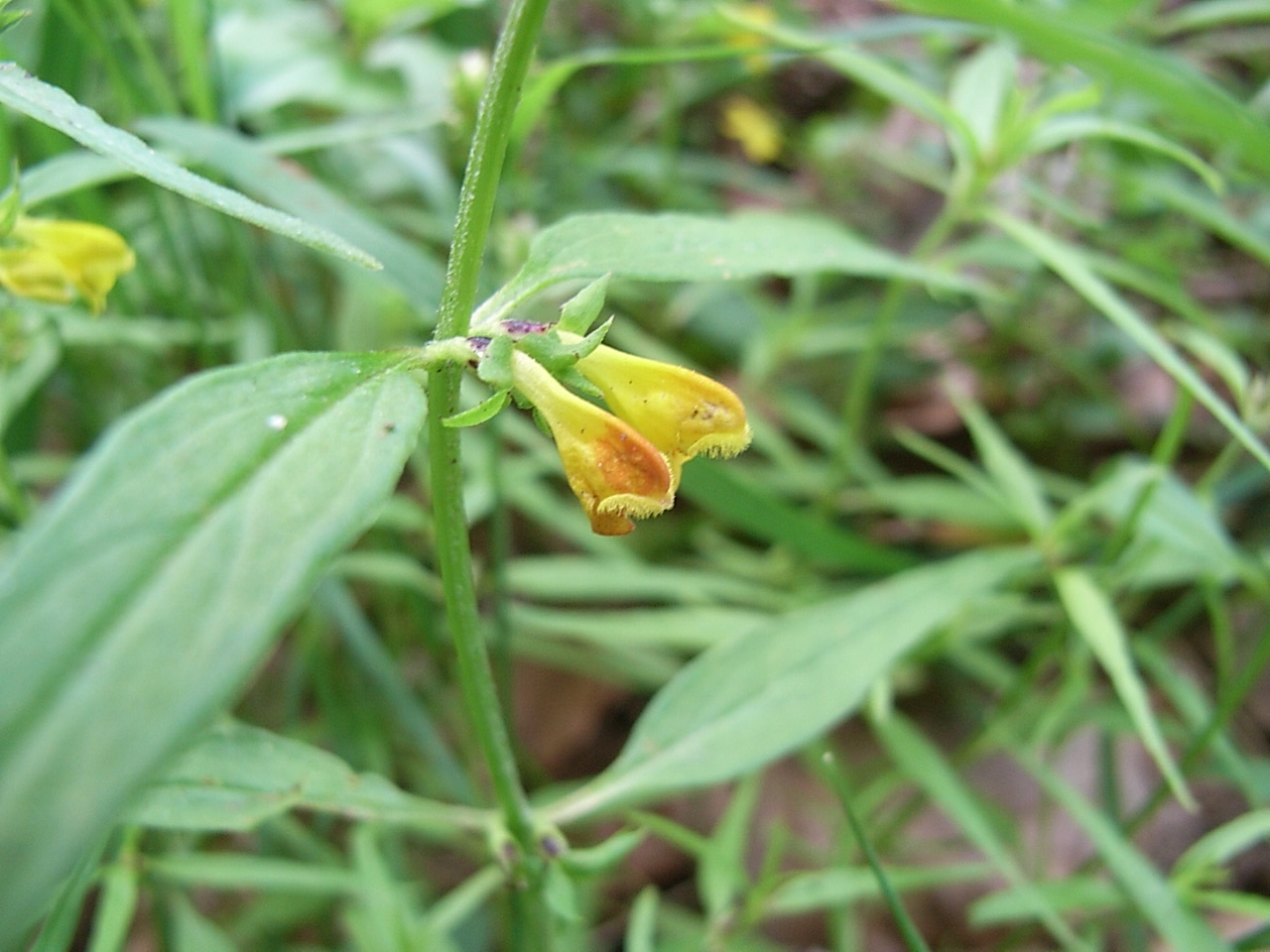

Scientific classification
- Kingdom: Plantae
- Clade: Tracheophytes
- Clade: Angiosperms
- Clade: Eudicots
- Clade: Asterids
- Order: Lamiales
- Family: Orobanchaceae
- Genus: Melampyrum
- Species: M. sylvaticum

Binomial name
- Melampyrum sylvaticum L.

= Melampyrum sylvaticum =

Species of flowering plant

Melampyrum sylvaticum, the small cow-wheat, is a plant species in the genus Melampyrum.
