= Taraxacum alpinum =

Taraxacum alpinum can refer to the following unplaced names in the dandelion genus Taraxacum:

- Taraxacum alpinum Hegetschw.
- Taraxacum alpinum K.Koch
- Taraxacum alpinum Schur
