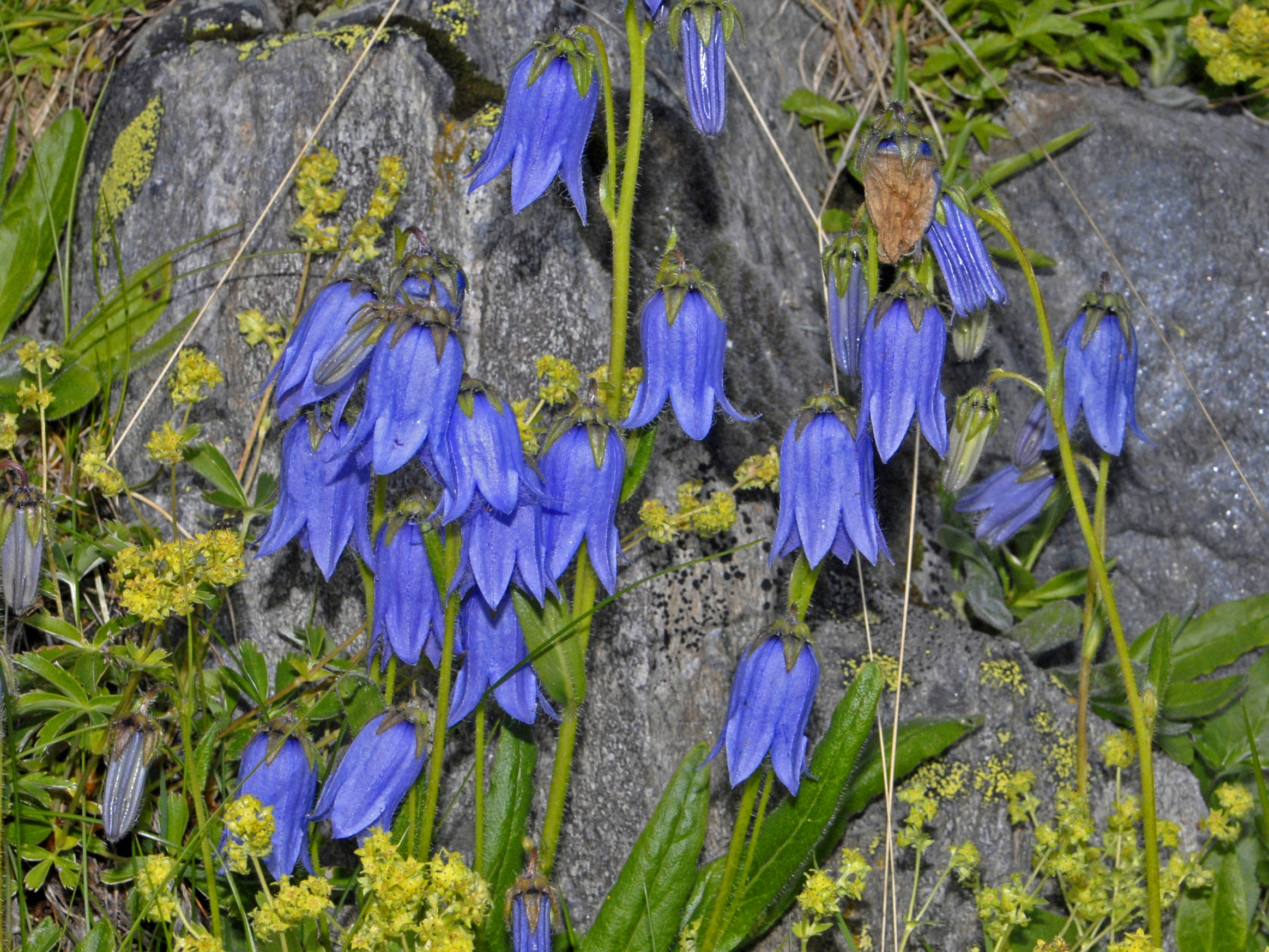
- Campanula barbata at the Giardino Botanico Alpino Chanousia
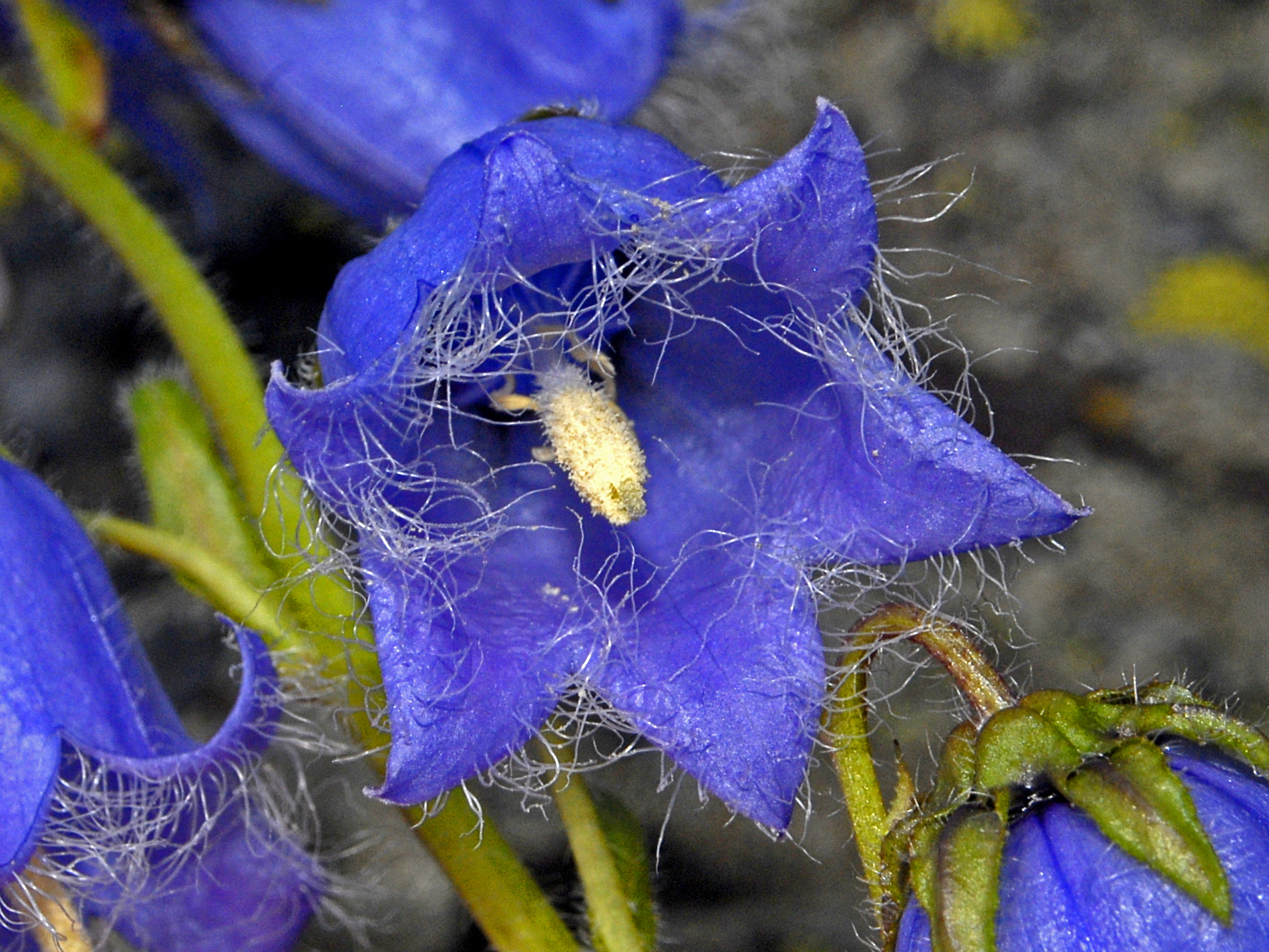
- Close-up on flower

Scientific classification
- Kingdom: Plantae
- Clade: Tracheophytes
- Clade: Angiosperms
- Clade: Eudicots
- Clade: Asterids
- Order: Asterales
- Family: Campanulaceae
- Genus: Campanula
- Species: C. barbata

Binomial name
- Campanula barbata L.

Synonyms
- List: Campanula barbata f. pusilla; Campanula barbata var. firmiana; Campanula barbata var. pusilla; Campanula barbata var. strictopedunculata; Campanula barbata var. uniflora; Campanula firmiana; Campanula macrorhiza var. pogonopetala

= Campanula barbata =

Species of flowering plant in the bellflower family

Campanula barbata, common name bearded bellflower, is a perennial flowering plant in the bellflower family Campanulaceae.

== Description ==
Campanula barbata can reach a height of 20–30 centimetres (7.9–11.8 in). This plant produces a small basal rosette of grayish-green leaves, simple, lanceolate with dentate margins and alternate. It has racemes of nodding, pale blue to deep blue campanulate flowers, which are hairy inside (hence the Latin name barbata, meaning bearded). They bloom from June to August.

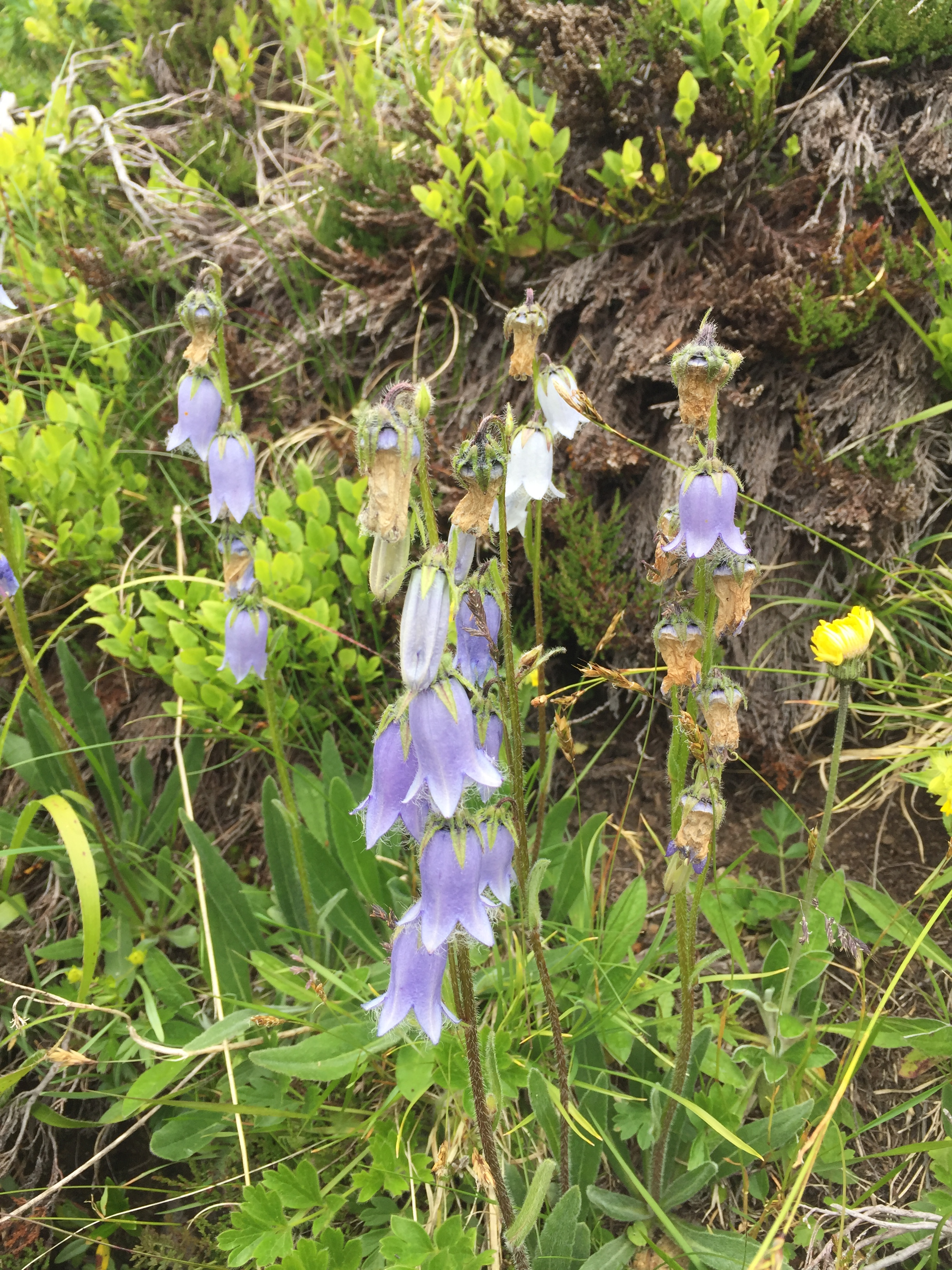
Campanula barbata at Sölden in Austria

== Distribution ==
This species is native to Norway, France, Italy and Central Europe.

== Habitat ==
Campanula barbata can be found in mountain regions at an elevation 1,100–2,600 metres (3,600–8,500 ft) above sea level.
