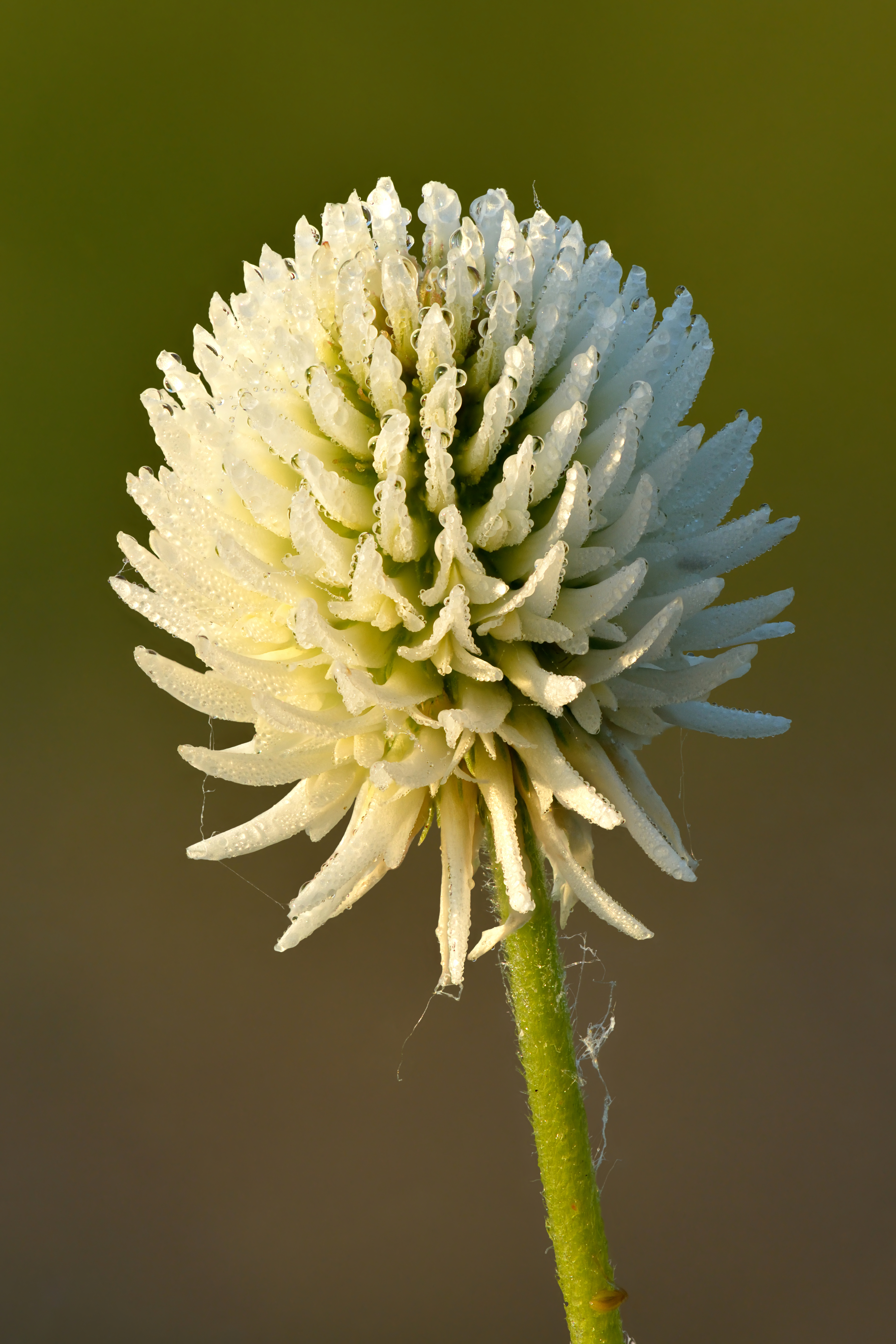
- Trifolium montanum

Scientific classification
- Kingdom: Plantae
- Clade: Tracheophytes
- Clade: Angiosperms
- Clade: Eudicots
- Clade: Rosids
- Order: Fabales
- Family: Fabaceae
- Subfamily: Faboideae
- Genus: Trifolium
- Species: T. montanum

Binomial name
- Trifolium montanum L.

= Trifolium montanum =

Species of legume

Trifolium montanum, the mountain clover, is a plant species of the genus Trifolium. It is the county flower of Oslo, Norway.
