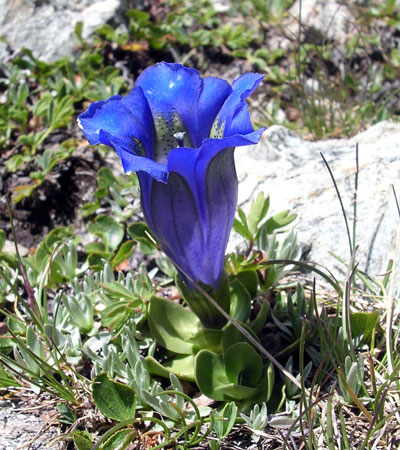

Scientific classification
- Kingdom: Plantae
- Clade: Tracheophytes
- Clade: Angiosperms
- Clade: Eudicots
- Clade: Asterids
- Order: Gentianales
- Family: Gentianaceae
- Genus: Gentiana
- Species: G. alpina

Binomial name
- Gentiana alpina Vill.

= Gentiana alpina =

Species of plant

Gentiana alpina (commonly Alpine gentian) is a plant species from the Gentiana genus in the family Gentianaceae.

== Description ==
=== Vegetative features ===
The Alpine gentian is a perennial herb that grows to only 8 centimetres (3 in). The opposite leaves are crowded at the base of the stem . The simple leaf blade is about 1 centimetre (0.4 in) long and nearly circular. The leaf margins are cartilaginous.

=== Generative traits ===
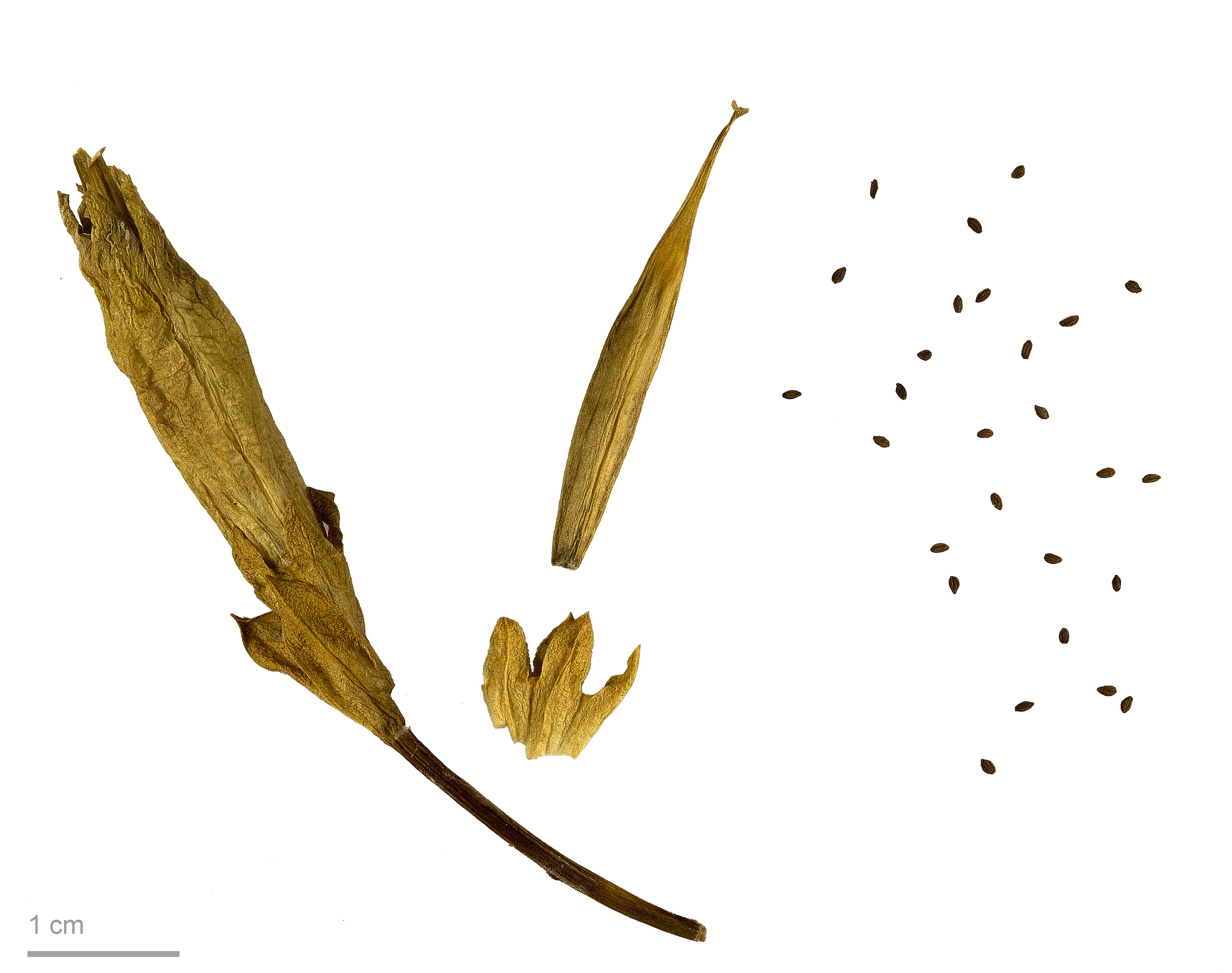
Fruit and seeds

The flowers are individually terminal on the stems. The hermaphrodite flowers are radially symmetric with a double perianth. The five green sepals are fused up to about half their length into a calyx tube, which ends in five ovoid calyx teeth that narrow towards the base. The dark blue crown is an inverted cone with a length of 40 to 70 millimetres (1.6 to 2.8 in). There are green dots in the crown gullet, the crown lobes are blunt and mostly rounded. G. alpina takes a hemicryptophytic form.

== Occurrence ==
Gentiana alpina is found in the south-west and west of the Middle Alps, the Middle Pyrenees and in the Sierra Nevada of southern Spain. It avoids growing in limestone rocks, and grows at elevations of 2,000 to 2,600 metres (6,600 to 8,500 ft). In the Alps, G. alpina typically occur in the Caricion curvulae plant association.

== In popular culture ==
Adolf von Kleebsattel created the song „Blau blüht der Enzian“, which became a bestseller thanks to performances by the musician Heino. The song provided the title of a feature film: Blue Blooms the Gentian.
