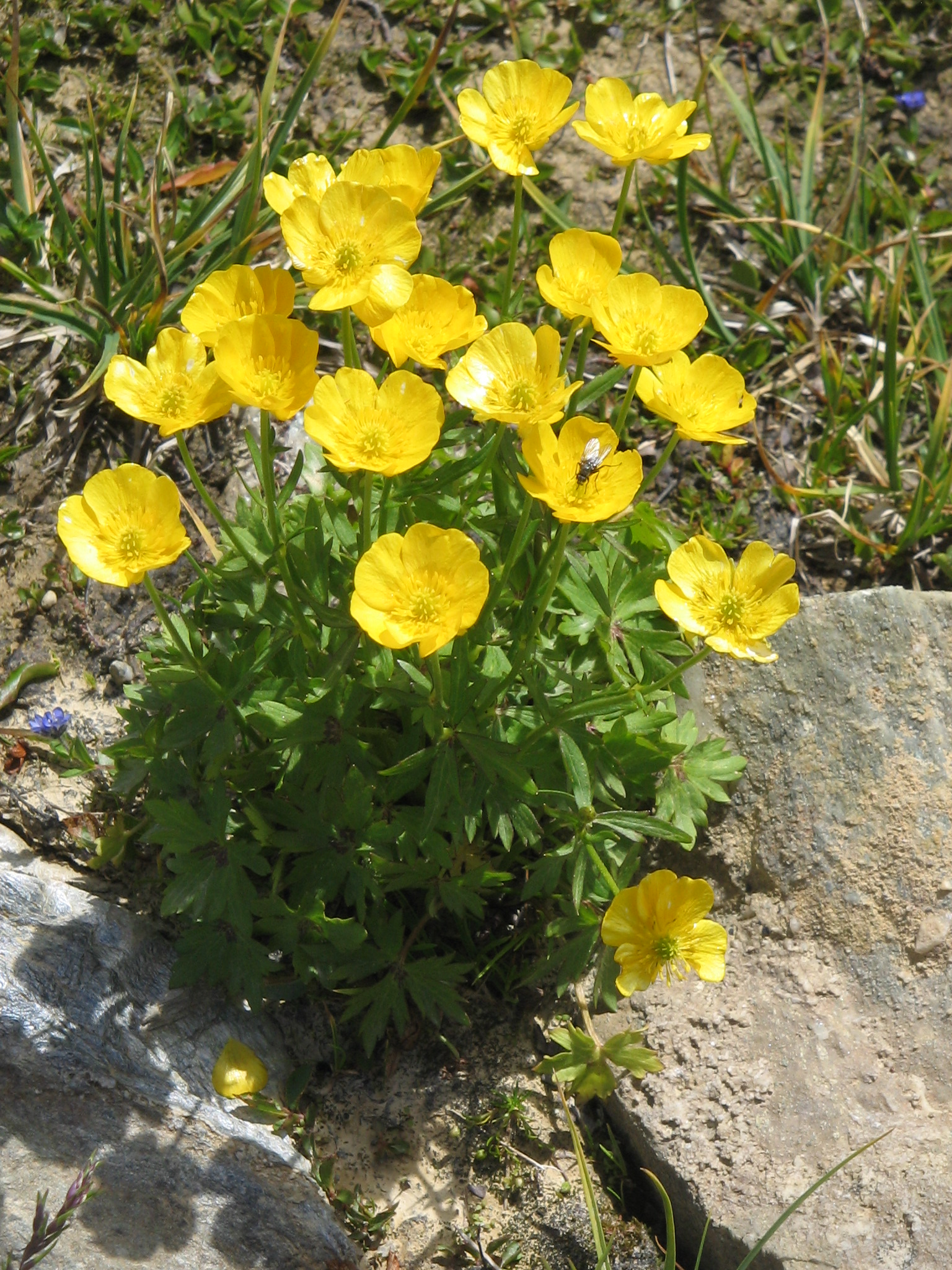
- Habit
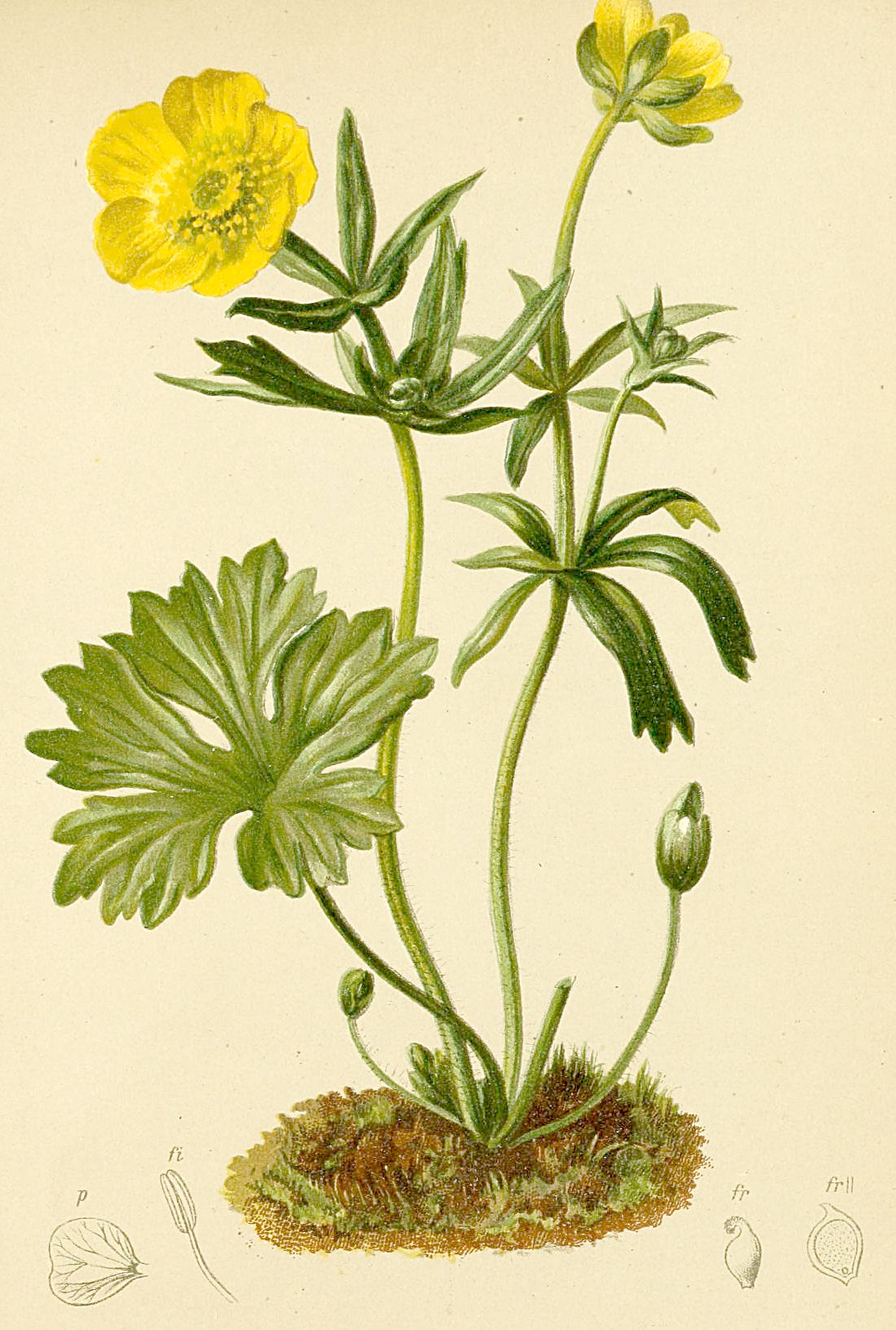
- Botanical illustration

Scientific classification
- Kingdom: Plantae
- Clade: Tracheophytes
- Clade: Angiosperms
- Clade: Eudicots
- Order: Ranunculales
- Family: Ranunculaceae
- Genus: Ranunculus
- Species: R. montanus

Binomial name
- Ranunculus montanus Willd.

Synonyms
- List: Ranunculastrum gracile Fourr.; Ranunculus alpicola Timb.-Lagr.; Ranunculus arolae Murr; Ranunculus gelidus Schur; Ranunculus geraniifolius Pourr.; Ranunculus gouanii Sm.; Ranunculus gracilis Schleich.; Ranunculus lerchenfeldianus Schur; Ranunculus lycoctonifolius Hegetschw.; Ranunculus minutus Leyb.; Ranunculus polymorphus Rochel; Ranunculus preslii Weihe ex Opiz; Ranunculus schurii Fuss ex Schur; Ranunculus szurulensis Lerchenf. ex Schur; Ranunculus tenuifolius (DC.) Schleich.; Ranunculus trilobatus Kit. ex Schltdl.; Ranunculus tuberosus Schur

= Ranunculus montanus =

Species of flowering plant

Ranunculus montanus, called the mountain buttercup along with other members of its genus, is a species of flowering plant in the family Ranunculaceae, native to the mountains of central and south-central Europe, with perhaps some populations in the Republic of Karelia in Russia. Its cultivar 'Molten Gold' has gained the Royal Horticultural Society's Award of Garden Merit.
