= Pincushion (disambiguation) =

A pincushion is a small cushion used in sewing to store pins or needles.

Pincushion or Pin Cushion may also refer to:

== Arts and entertainment ==
- "Pincushion" (song), by ZZ Top, 1994
- "The Pin Cushion" by Fabian Nicieza and Steve Skroce, 2000
- Pin Cushion (film) by Deborah Haywood, 2017

== Plants ==
- Chaenactis, a genus of wildflowers known as pincushions
- Diapensia lapponica, the pincushion plant
- Hakea laurina, or pin-cushion hakea
- Isopogon dubius, or pincushion coneflower
- Leucospermum, or pincushions, a genus of evergreen shrubs
- Navarretia, or pincushion plants, a genus of flowering plants
- Nertera granadensis, or pin-cushion plant, a plant with orange berries
- Scabiosa, or pincushion flowers, a genus in the honeysuckle family of flowering plants
- Pincushion cactus, several genera

== See also ==
- Pincushion distortion, in optics
