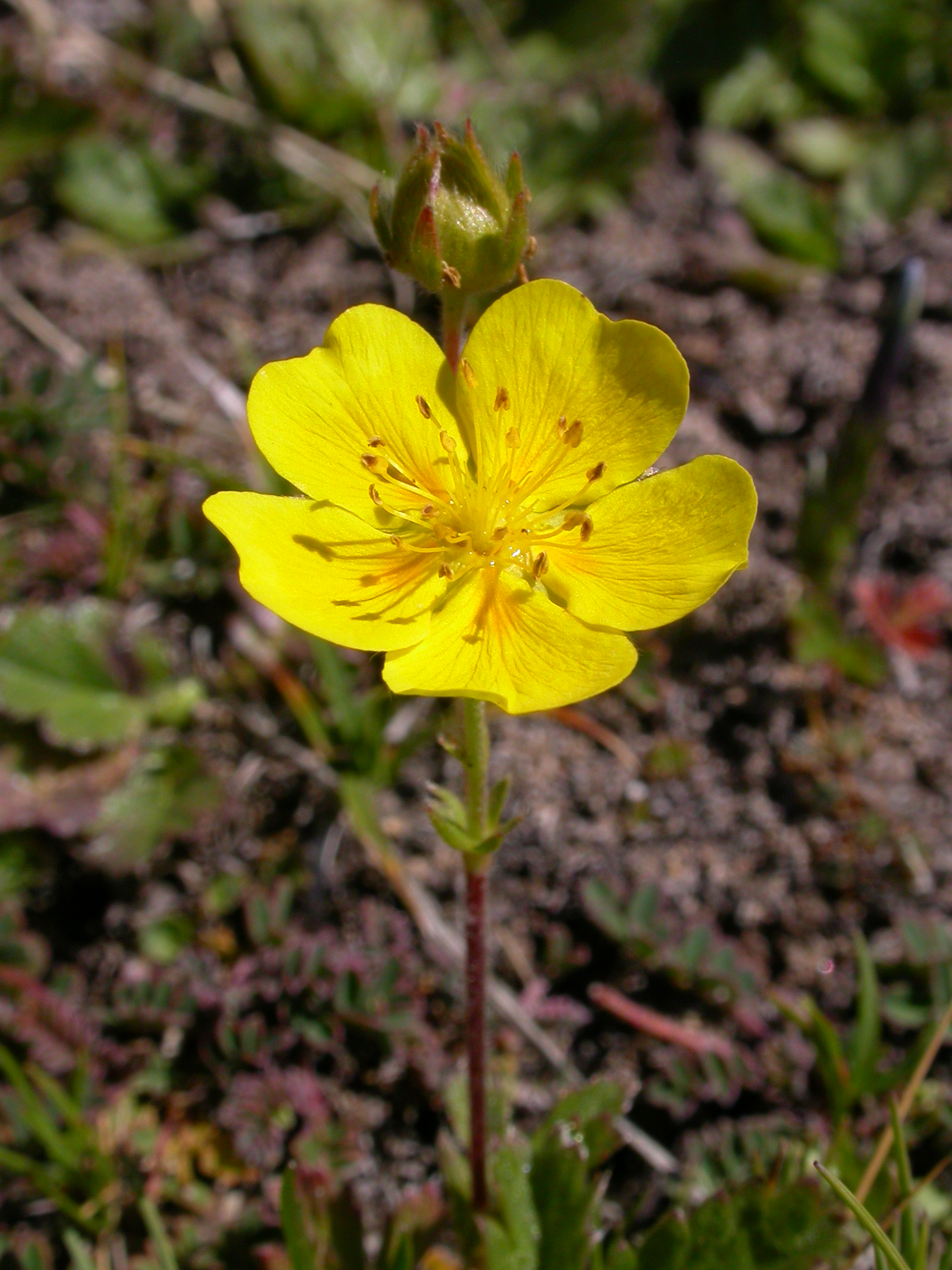

Scientific classification
- Kingdom: Plantae
- Clade: Tracheophytes
- Clade: Angiosperms
- Clade: Eudicots
- Clade: Rosids
- Order: Rosales
- Family: Rosaceae
- Genus: Potentilla
- Species: P. grandiflora

Binomial name
- Potentilla grandiflora L.

Synonyms
- Dynamidium vernum (L.) Fourr.; Fragaria grandiflora (L.) Lam.; Potentilla gallica Siegfr.; Potentilla grandiflora var. pedemontana (Boiss. & Reut.) Gremli ex Burnat & Briq.; Potentilla grandiflora subsp. pedemontana (Boiss. & Reut.) Nyman; Potentilla pedemontana Boiss. & Reut.; Potentilla subnitens Arv.-Touv.; Potentilla verna L.

= Potentilla grandiflora =

Species of flowering plant

Potentilla grandiflora is a species of cinquefoil found in Monaco, Northern Italy, and Switzerland
