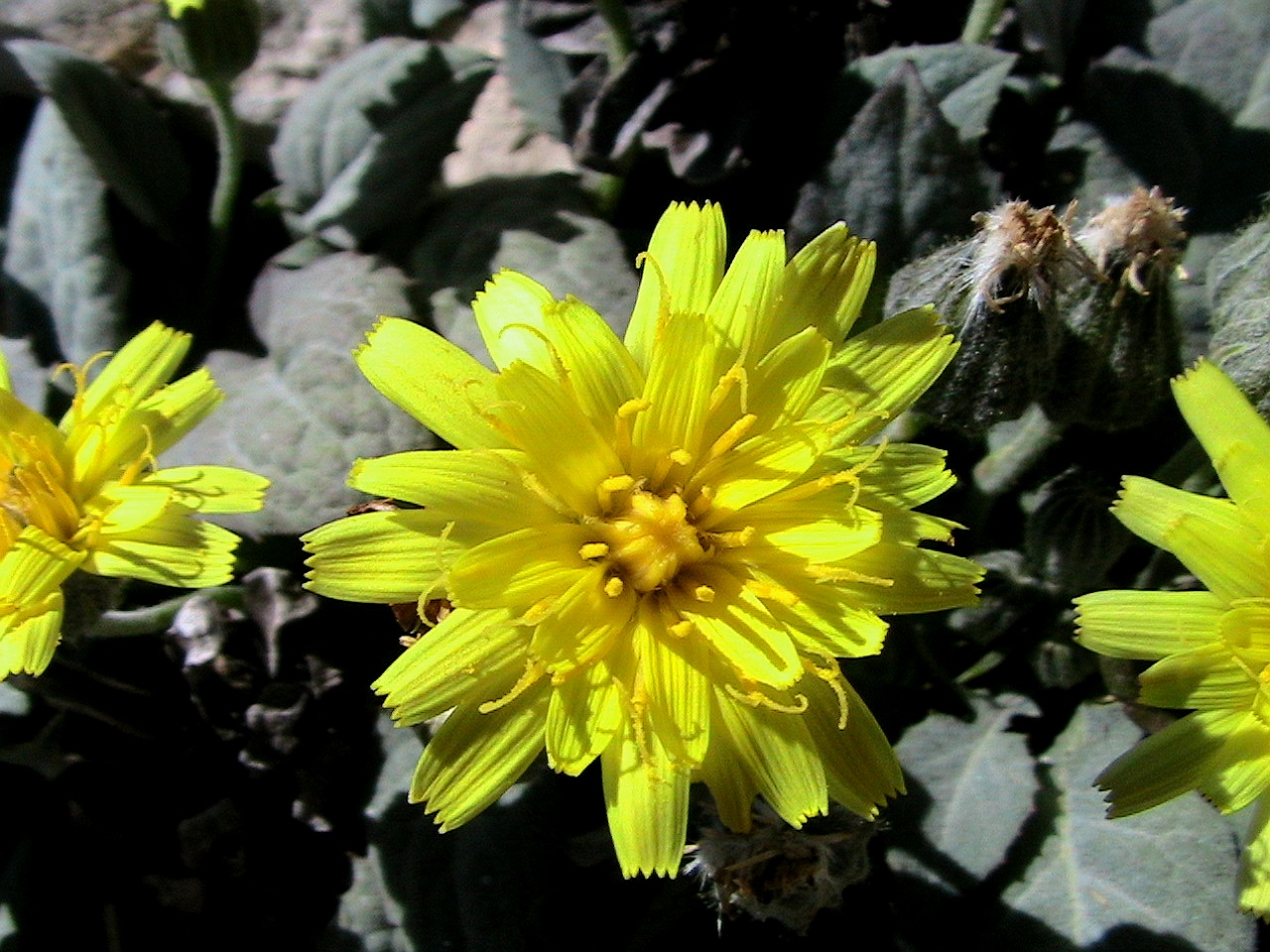

Scientific classification
- Kingdom: Plantae
- Clade: Tracheophytes
- Clade: Angiosperms
- Clade: Eudicots
- Clade: Asterids
- Order: Asterales
- Family: Asteraceae
- Genus: Crepis
- Species: C. pygmaea

Binomial name
- Crepis pygmaea L.

= Crepis pygmaea =

Species of flowering plant

Crepis pygmaea (commonly pygmy hawksbeard) is a species of flowering plant in the genus Crepis in the family Asteraceae.

== Description ==
=== Vegetative features ===
The pygmy hawksbeard grows as a perennial herbaceous plant and reaches a height of 5 to 15 centimetres (2.0 to 5.9 in). The stems are arching and ascending, mostly branched, one or more heads, white tomentose or glabrous, often tinged with purple. The plant has few leaves. The above-ground parts of the plant are hairy.

The lower leaves are heart-shaped and usually long-stemmed. The upper leaves are irregularly pinnate with a very large end section and small side sections. The underside of the leaf is often tinged with purple.

=== Generative traits ===
The flowering period extends from July to August. The cup-shaped inflorescence has a diameter of about 2 to 3 centimetres (3/4 to 1 1/4 in) and contains only ray florets. The bracts are bell-shaped, white, and 10 to 15 millimetres (3/8 to 5/8 in) long. The fruits are 4 to 6 millimetres (3/16 to 1/4 in) long. The calyx is 7 to 10 millimetres (1/4 to 3/8 in) long and white.

The chromosome number is 2n = 8 or 12.

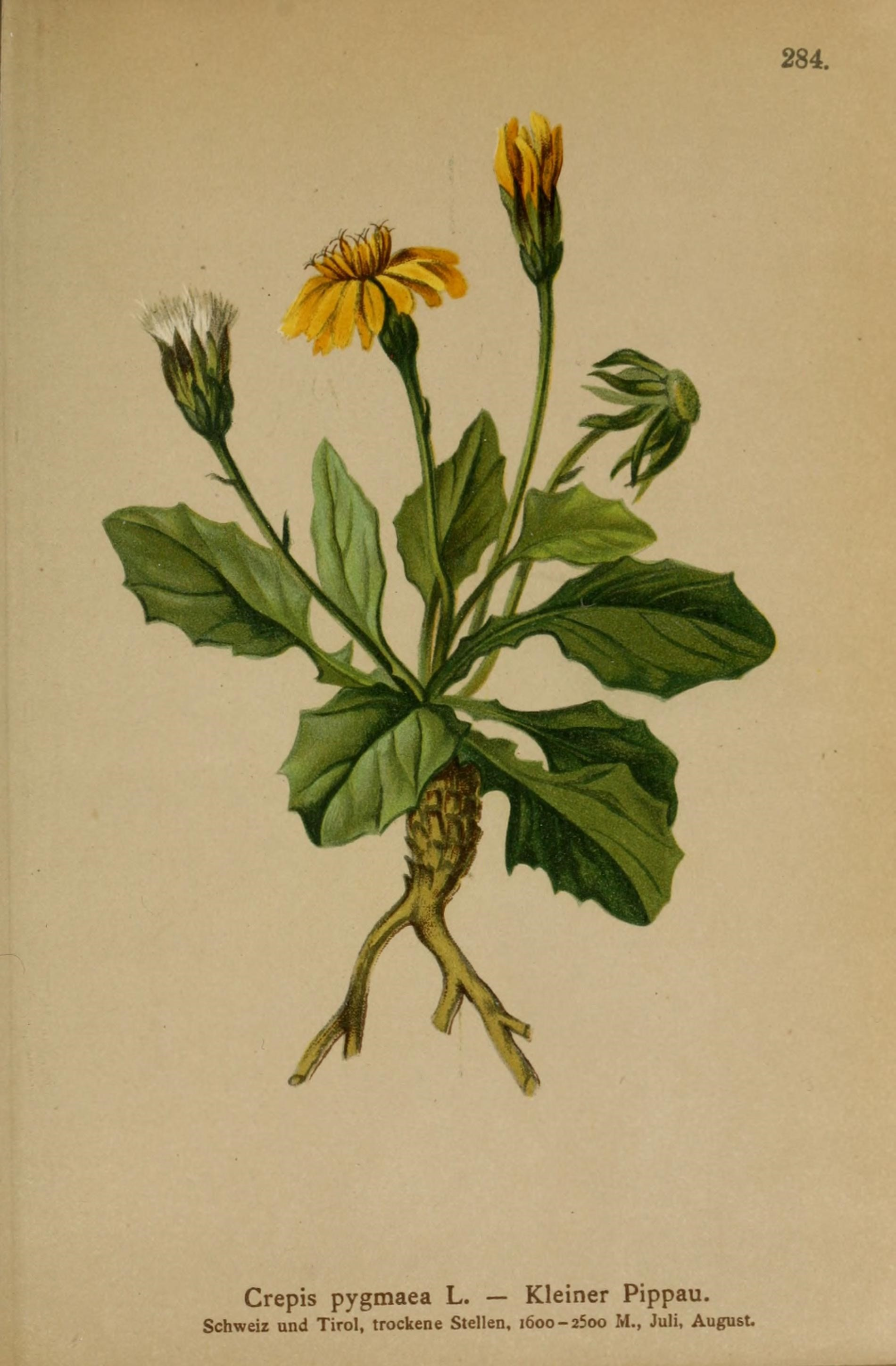
Illustration

== Occurrence ==
The pygmy hawksbeard occurs in the Pyrenees and the western Alps, in Spain, Andorra, France, Switzerland, and Austria. The plant thrives on moist, coarse scree slopes at elevations of 1,500 to 2,900 metres (4,900 to 9,500 ft).
