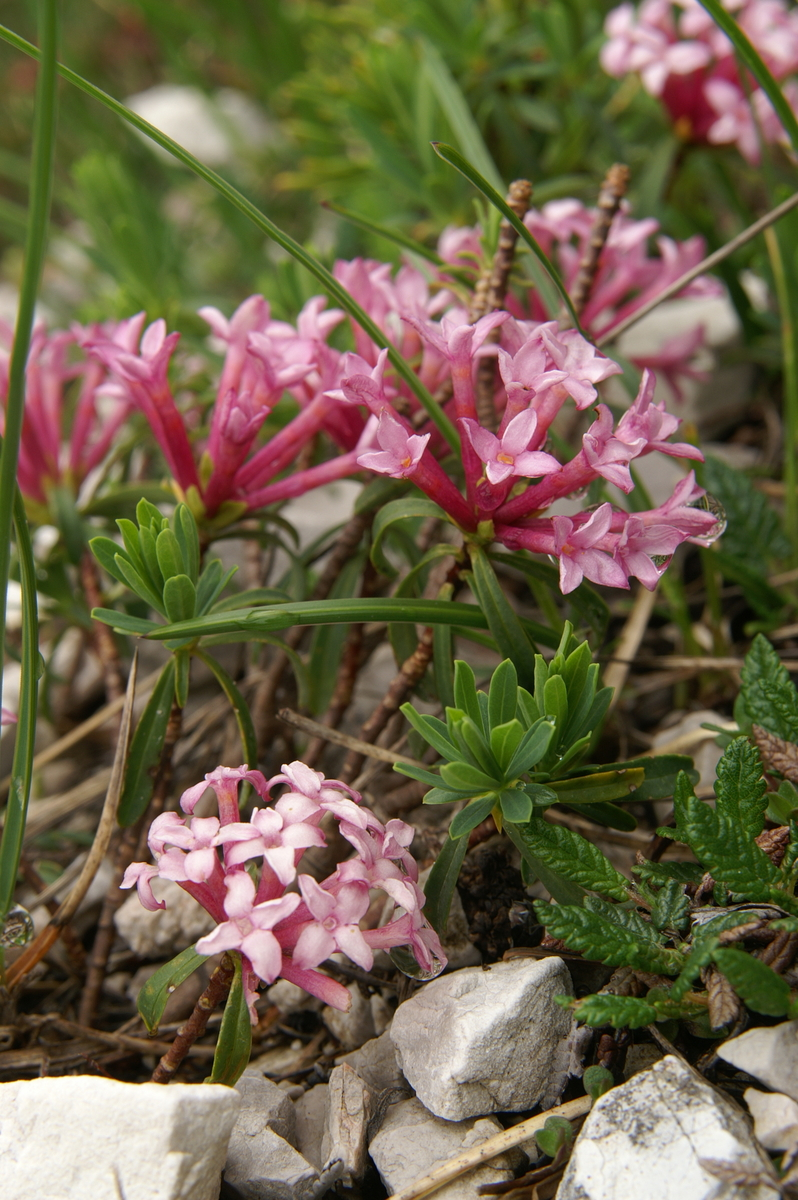

Scientific classification
- Kingdom: Plantae
- Clade: Tracheophytes
- Clade: Angiosperms
- Clade: Eudicots
- Clade: Rosids
- Order: Malvales
- Family: Thymelaeaceae
- Genus: Daphne
- Species: D. striata

Binomial name
- Daphne striata Tratt.

= Daphne striata =

Species of shrub

Daphne striata is a shrub, of the family Thymelaeaceae. It is native to the European Alps and the Dolomites.

== Description ==
The shrub is semi-evergreen, and grows up to 30 cm tall. Its branches grow tall and slender and its leaves grow narrow. It grows in cool and moist environments, making mountain environments most ideal. It is often found in short grassland and low scrub at altitudes of 1500 to 3000 m.
