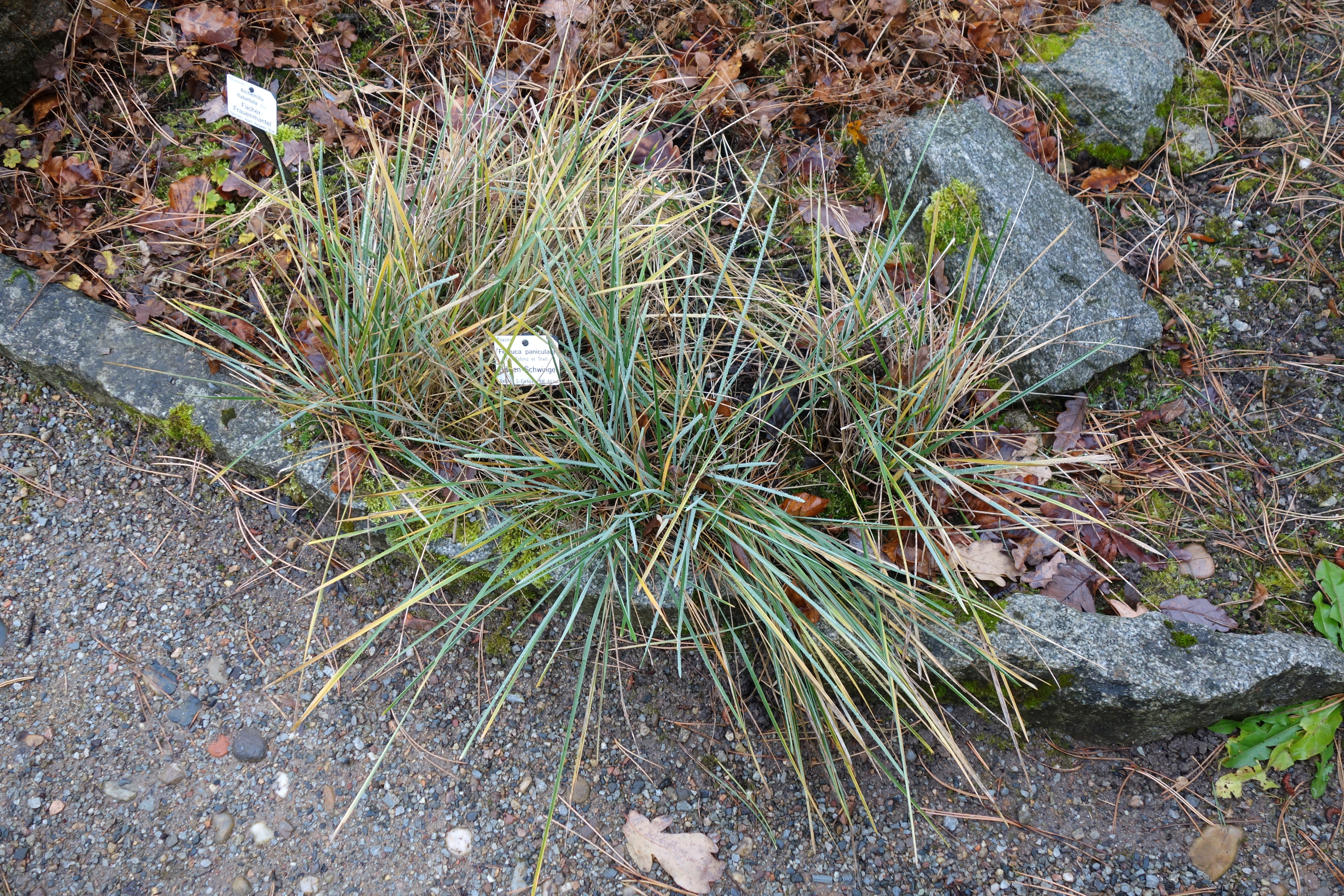

Scientific classification
- Kingdom: Plantae
- Clade: Tracheophytes
- Clade: Angiosperms
- Clade: Monocots
- Clade: Commelinids
- Order: Poales
- Family: Poaceae
- Subfamily: Pooideae
- Genus: Festuca
- Species: F. paniculata

Binomial name
- Festuca paniculata (L.) Schinz & Thell.

Synonyms
- Synonymy: Anthoxanthum paniculatum L.; Festuca anthoxanthia Sm.; Festuca aurea Lam.; Festuca baetica (Hack.) Hack. ex Asch. & Graebn.; Festuca baetica (Hack.) Richt.; Festuca baetica subsp. moleroi (Cebolla & Rivas Ponce) Cebolla & Rivas Ponce; Festuca bulbosa Delarbre; Festuca caerulescens Boiss. ex Hack.; Festuca compressa DC.; Festuca consobrina Timb.-Lagr.; Festuca durandoi subsp. fontqueri (Rivas Ponce & Cebolla) Llamas, Acedo, Penas & Pérez Morales; Festuca ferruginea (Vest) Rchb.; Festuca fibrosa Griseb.; Festuca fleischeri Steud.; Festuca fusca Vill.; Festuca gigantea Krock.; Festuca montis-celtici Delarbre; Festuca paniculata subsp. baetica (Hack.) Emb. & Maire; Festuca paniculata var. baetica (Hack.) Maire & Weiller; Festuca paniculata subsp. baetica (Hack.) Markgr.-Dann.; Festuca paniculata var. capillifolia (Pau ex Willk.) O.Bolòs & Vigo; Festuca paniculata subsp. consobrina (Timb.-Lagr.) Markgr.-Dann.; Festuca paniculata subsp. consobrina (Timb.-Lagr.) Soják; Festuca paniculata subsp. fontqueri Rivas Ponce & Cebolla; Festuca paniculata subsp. longiglumis (Litard.) Kerguélen; Festuca paniculata var. longiglumis (Litard.) Cebolla; Festuca paniculata subsp. macrostachys Llamas, Acedo, Penas & Pérez Morales; Festuca paniculata subsp. moleri (Cebolla & Rivas Ponce) Rivas Mart. & Asensi & Molero Mesa & F. Valle; Festuca paniculata subsp. moleroi (Cebolla & Rivas Ponce) Rivas Mart., A.Asensi, Molero Mesa & F.Valle; Festuca paniculata var. moleroi Cebolla, Lozano & Rivas Ponce; Festuca paniculata subsp. multispiculata Rivas Ponce & Cebolla; Festuca paniculata subsp. paui Cebolla & Rivas Ponce; Festuca paniculata subsp. spadicea (L.) Litard.; Festuca paradoxa Ehrh. ex Steud.; Festuca spadicea L.; Festuca spadicea var. baetica Hack.; Festuca spadicea var. capillifolia Pau ex Willk.; Festuca spadicea subsp. longiglumis (Litard.) Kerguélen; Poa gerardii All.; Poa montana Delarbre; Poa spadicea (L.) Koeler; Poa triflora Moench; Schedonorus aureus (Lam.) P.Beauv.; Schedonorus compressus (DC.) Roem. & Schult.; Schedonorus consobrinus Timb.-Lagr.; Schedonorus ferrugineus Vest; Schedonorus × fleischeri (Dörfl.) Holub; Schedonorus spadiceus (L.) Roem. & Schult.

= Festuca paniculata =

Species of grass

Festuca paniculata (east Alpine violet fescue) is a grass with culms 60–120 cm long, endemic to central, southwestern, and southeastern Europe and northern Africa. It was first described in 1913.
