= Flora of the Alps =

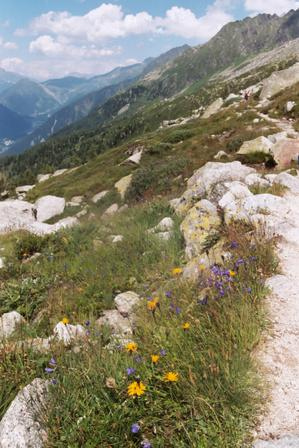
Flora typical of the Alpine Region of the Alps

The Alps are one of the great mountain range systems of Europe stretching approximately 1,200 kilometres (750 mi) across eight Alpine countries from Austria and Slovenia in the east, Switzerland, Liechtenstein, Germany, France to the west and Italy and Monaco to the south. The flora of the Alps are diverse. In the mountains, the vegetation gradually changes with altitude, sun exposure, and location on the mountain. There are five successive life zones, each with distinct landscapes and vegetation characteristics: premontane, montane, subalpine, alpine, and alvar.

== List of Alpine plants ==
=== A ===
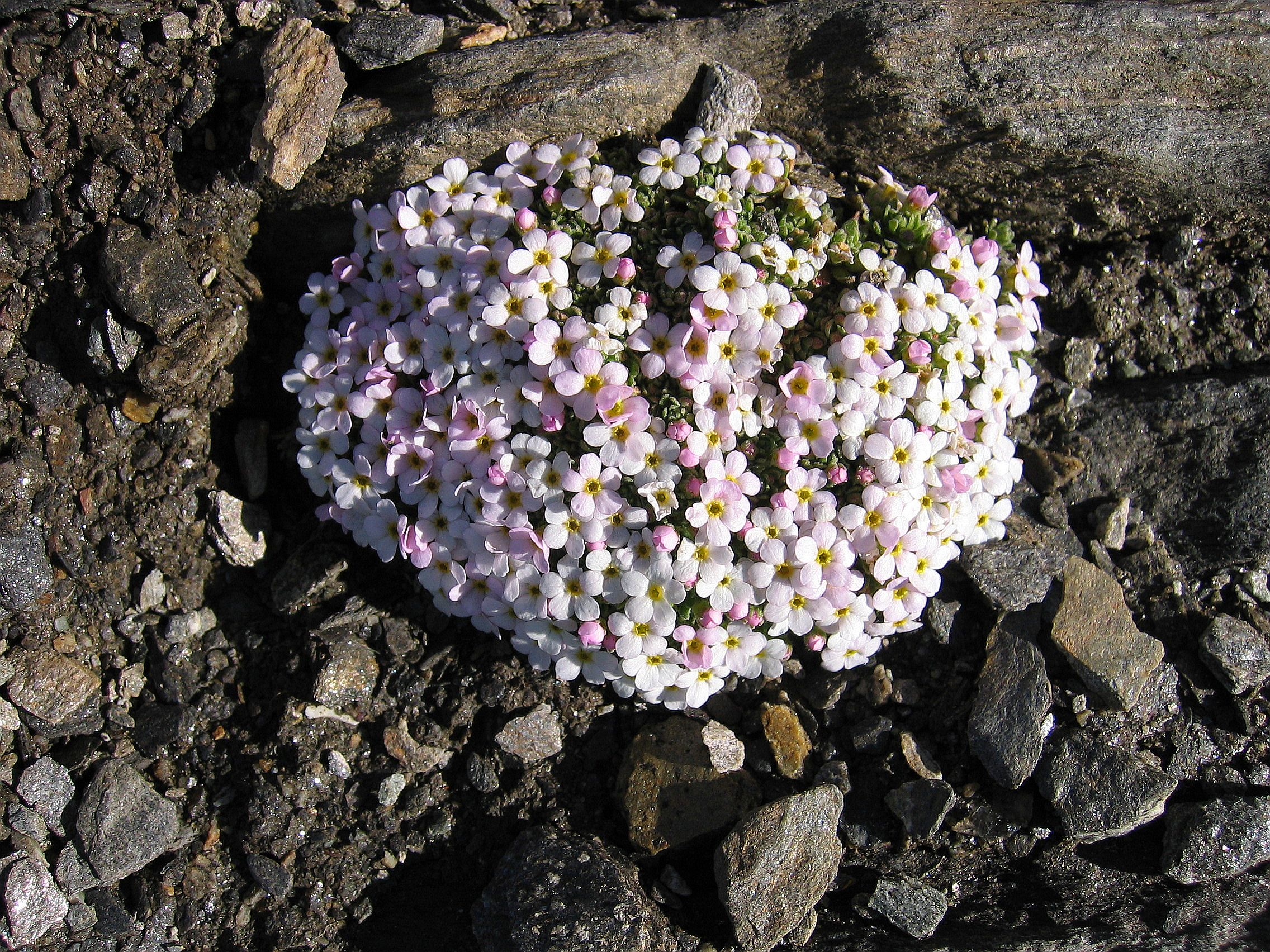
Alpine rock-jasmine (Androsace alpina)

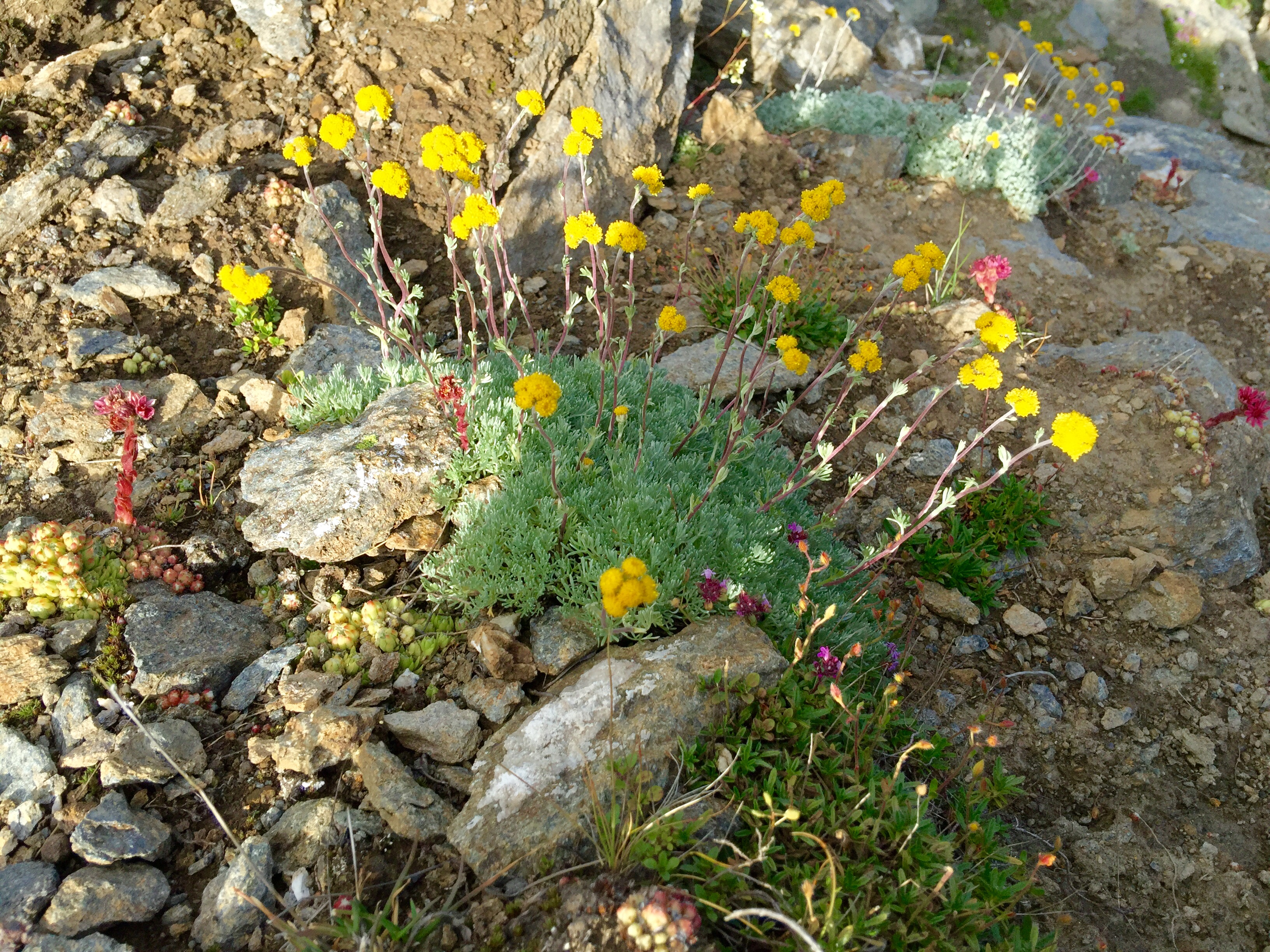
Artemisia glacialis, the rarest kind of Genepi (wormwood)

- Achillea atrata
- Aconitum lycoctonum
- Aconitum napellus
- Adenostyles alliariae
- Adenostyles leucophylla
- Agrimonia eupatoria
- Alchemilla alpina
- Allium insubricum
- Androsace alpina
- Androsace brevis
- Androsace carnea
- Anemone vernalis
- Antennaria dioica
- Aquilegia alpina
- Arctostaphylos alpinus
- Arenaria pseudofrigida
- Armeria alpina
- Arnica montana
- Artemisia mutellina
- Asphodelus albus
- Aster alpinus
- Astrantia major

=== C ===
- Caltha palustris
- Campanula barbata
- Campanula persicifolia
- Campanula thyrsoides
- Campanula zoysii
- Carlina acanthifolia
- Carlina acaulis
- Carlina vulgaris
- Carex curvula
- Centaurea jacea
- Centaurea montana
- Centaurea phrygia
- Centaurea scabiosa
- Chamerion angustifolium
- Chamorchis alpina
- Chenopodium bonus-henricus
- Cicerbita alpina
- Cicerbita plumieri
- Cirsium spinosissimum
- Clematis alpina
- Crocus vernus
- Cyclamen europaeum
- Cypripedium calceolus

=== D ===
- Dactylorhiza fuchsii
- Dactylorhiza maculata
- Daphne cneorum
- Dianthus monspessulanus
- Dianthus pavonius
- Digitalis grandiflora
- Digitalis lutea
- Digitalis purpurea
- Doronicum grandiflorum
- Dryas octopetala

=== E ===
- Erinus alpinus
- Eriophorum angustifolium
- Eritrichium nanum
- Eryngium alpinum

=== G ===
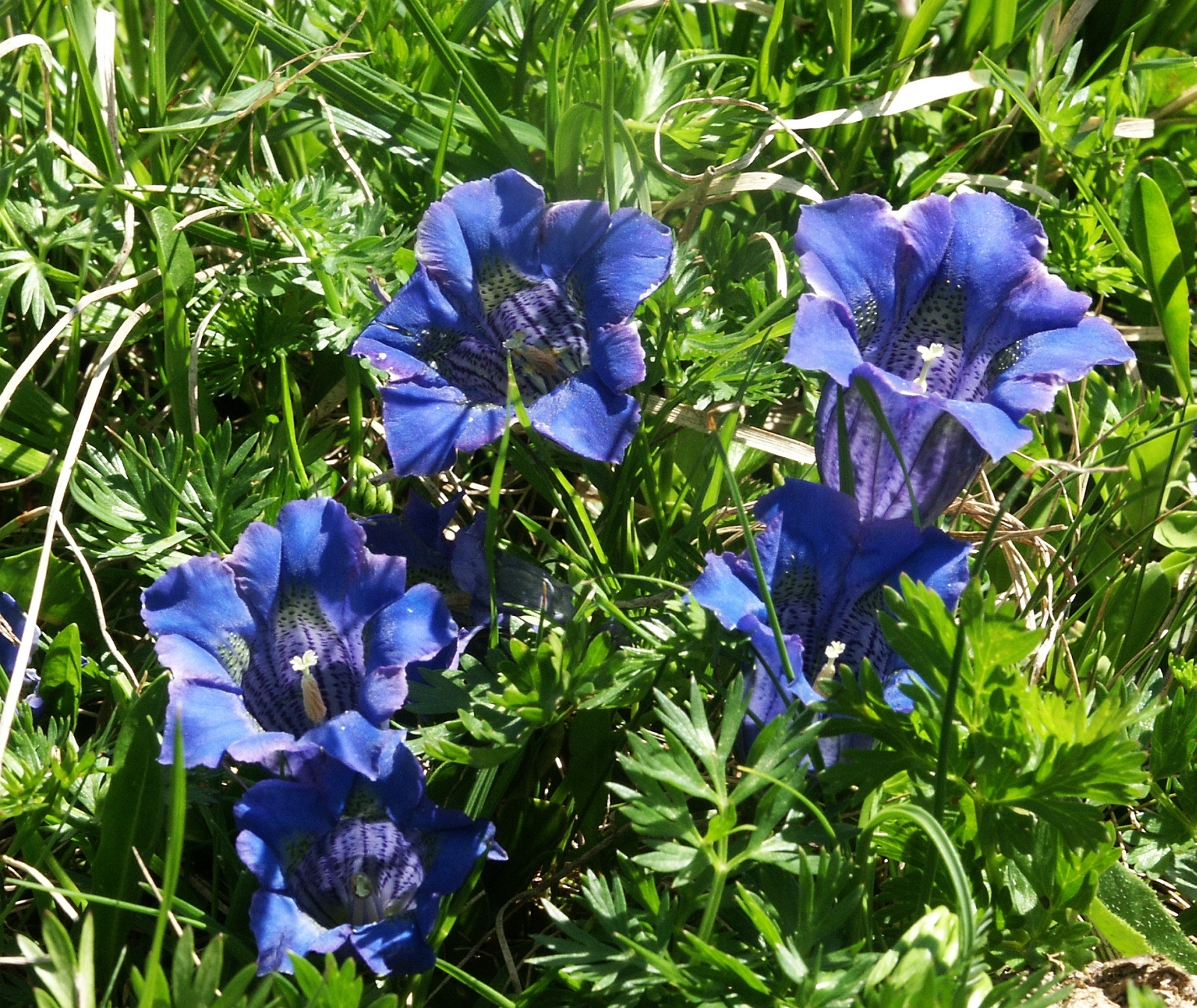
Gentiana acaulis, Zillertal Alps

- Gentiana acaulis
- Gentiana alpina
- Gentiana kochiana
- Gentiana lutea
- Gentiana nivalis
- Gentiana verna
- Geranium silvaticum
- Geum montanum
- Gymnadenia conopsea

=== H ===
- Heracleum sphondylium
- Hieracium alpinum
- Hieracium pilosella
- Hieracum intybaceum

=== I ===
- Inula montana
- Iris pseudacorus

=== L ===
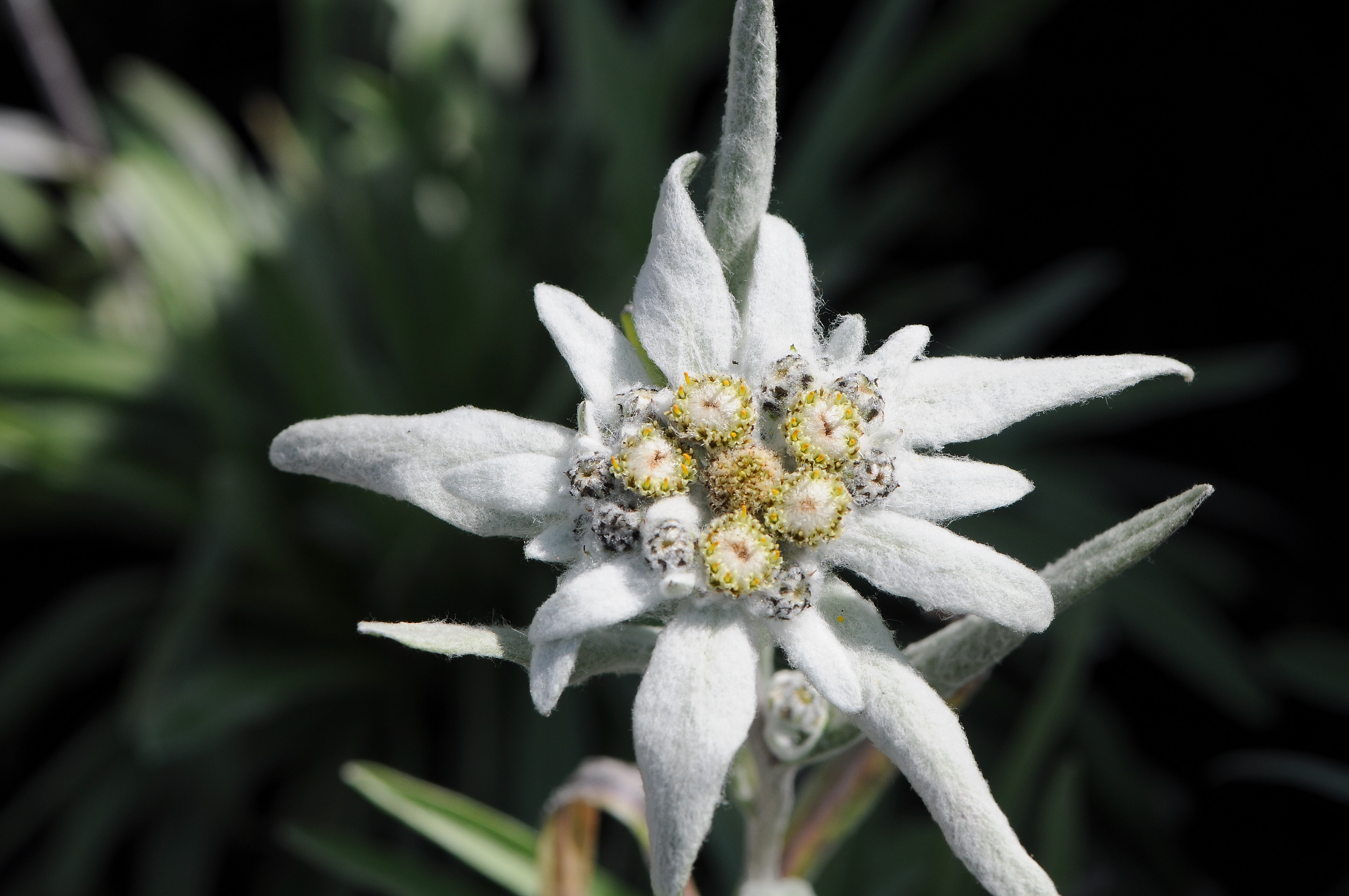
Edelweiss (Leontopodium alpinum), Vorarlberg

- Leontopodium alpinum
- Leucanthemopsis alpina
- Lilium bulbiferum
- Lilium martagon
- Linaria alpina
- Loiseleurie couchée

=== M ===
- Melampyrum arvense
- Melampyrum nemorosum
- Melampyrum pratense
- Micranthes stellaris, syn. Saxifraga stellaris

=== N ===
- Nigritella rhellicani

=== O ===
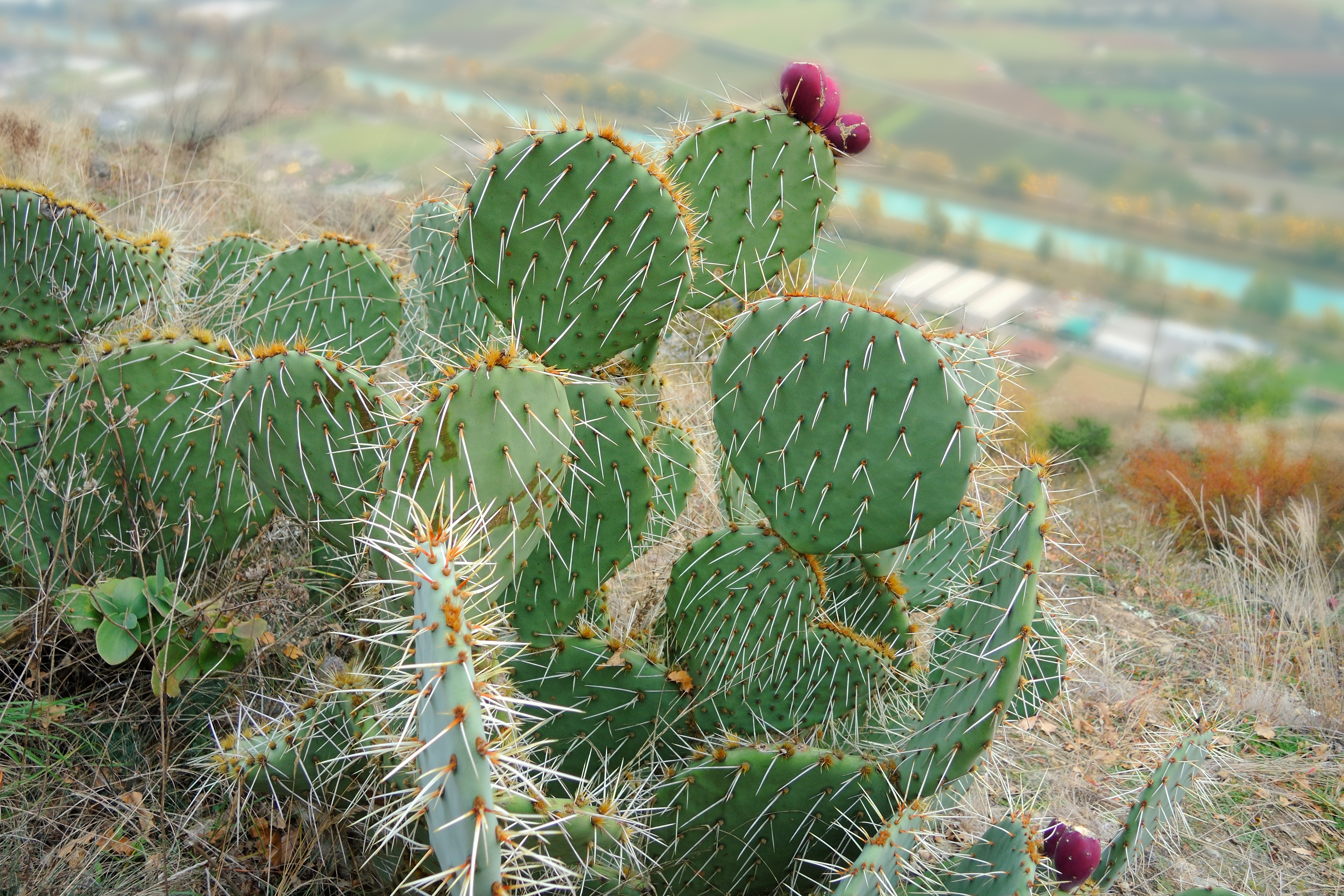
Opuntia engelmannii in the dry Rhone Valley

- Ophrys fuciflora
- Opuntia

=== P ===
- Paederota bonarota
- Paederota lutea
- Papaver hi
- Papaver rhaeticum
- Paradisea liliastrum
- Phyteuma hemisphaericum
- Phyteuma spicatum
- Pinguicula alpina
- Pinguicula grandiflora
- Pinguicula vulgaris

=== R ===
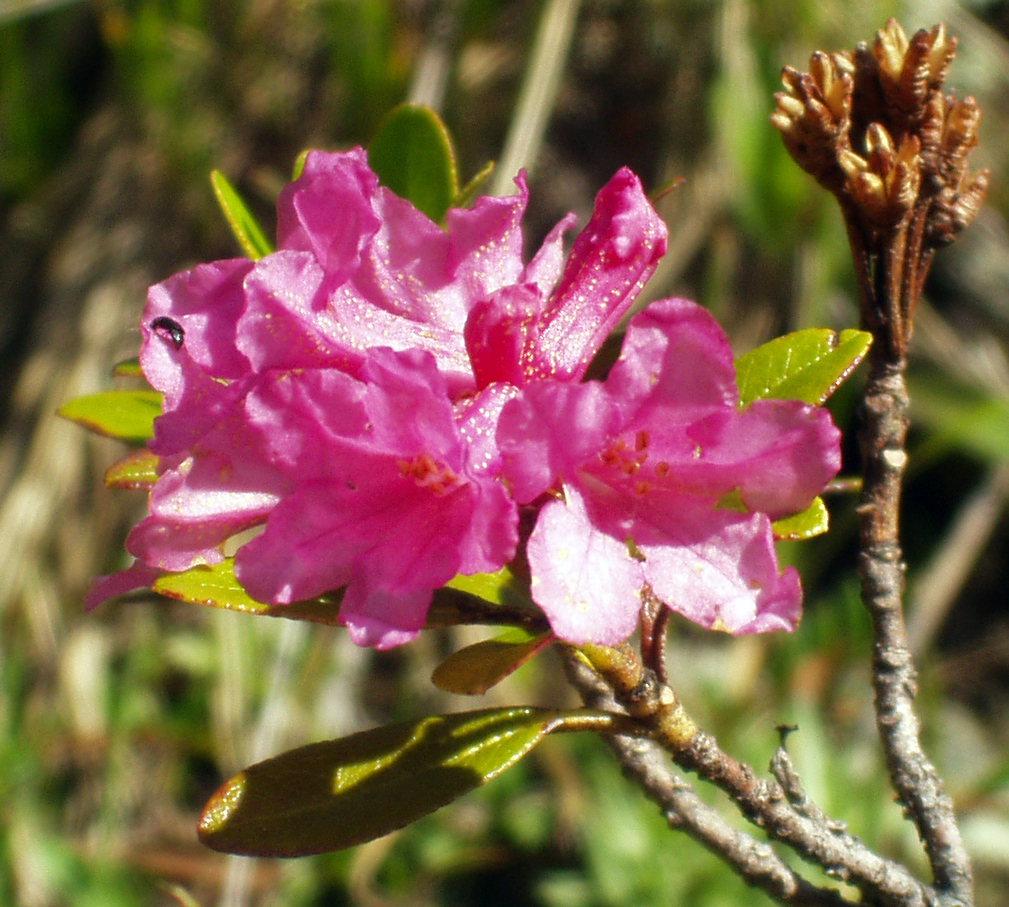
Rusty-leaved Alpenrose, (Rhododendron ferrugineum)

- Ranunculus glacialis
- Ranunculus pyrenaeus
- Rhododendron ferrugineum
- Rosa pendulina
- Rumex crispus
- Rumex nivalis

=== S ===
- Saxifraga burseriana
- Saxifraga oppositifolia
- Saxifraga paniculata
- Saxifraga tombeanensis
- Scabiosa columbaria
- Scabiosa lucida
- Scilla bifolia
- Sempervivum archnoideum
- Sempervivum montanum
- Senecio doronicum
- Senecio fuchsii
- Senecio leucophyllus
- Silene acaulis
- Silene rupestris
- Silene vulgaris
- Soldanella alpina
- Stipa pennata

=== T ===
- Trifolium alpinum
- Trollius europaeus

=== V ===
- Veratrum album
