= Agonopterix senecionis =

Scientific classification
- Kingdom: Animalia
- Phylum: Arthropoda
- Clade: Pancrustacea
- Class: Insecta
- Order: Lepidoptera
- Family: Depressariidae
- Genus: Agonopterix
- Species: A. senecionis

Binomial name
- Agonopterix senecionis (Nickerl, 1864)

Synonyms
- Depressaria senecionis Nickerl, 1864; Depressaria cotoneastri Nickerl, 1864; Depressaria sarracenella Rössler, 1866; Depressaria marmotella Frey, 1868

Species of moth

Agonopterix senecionis is a moth of the family Depressariidae. It is found from Germany, the Baltic region and Russia to the Iberian Peninsula, Italy and Romania.

The larvae feed on Doronicum, Senecio doria, Senecio doronicum, Senecio fluviatilis, Senecio nemorensis and Senecio ovatus. They initially mine the leaves of their host plant. Pupation takes place outside of the mine. Larvae can be found from May to July.
