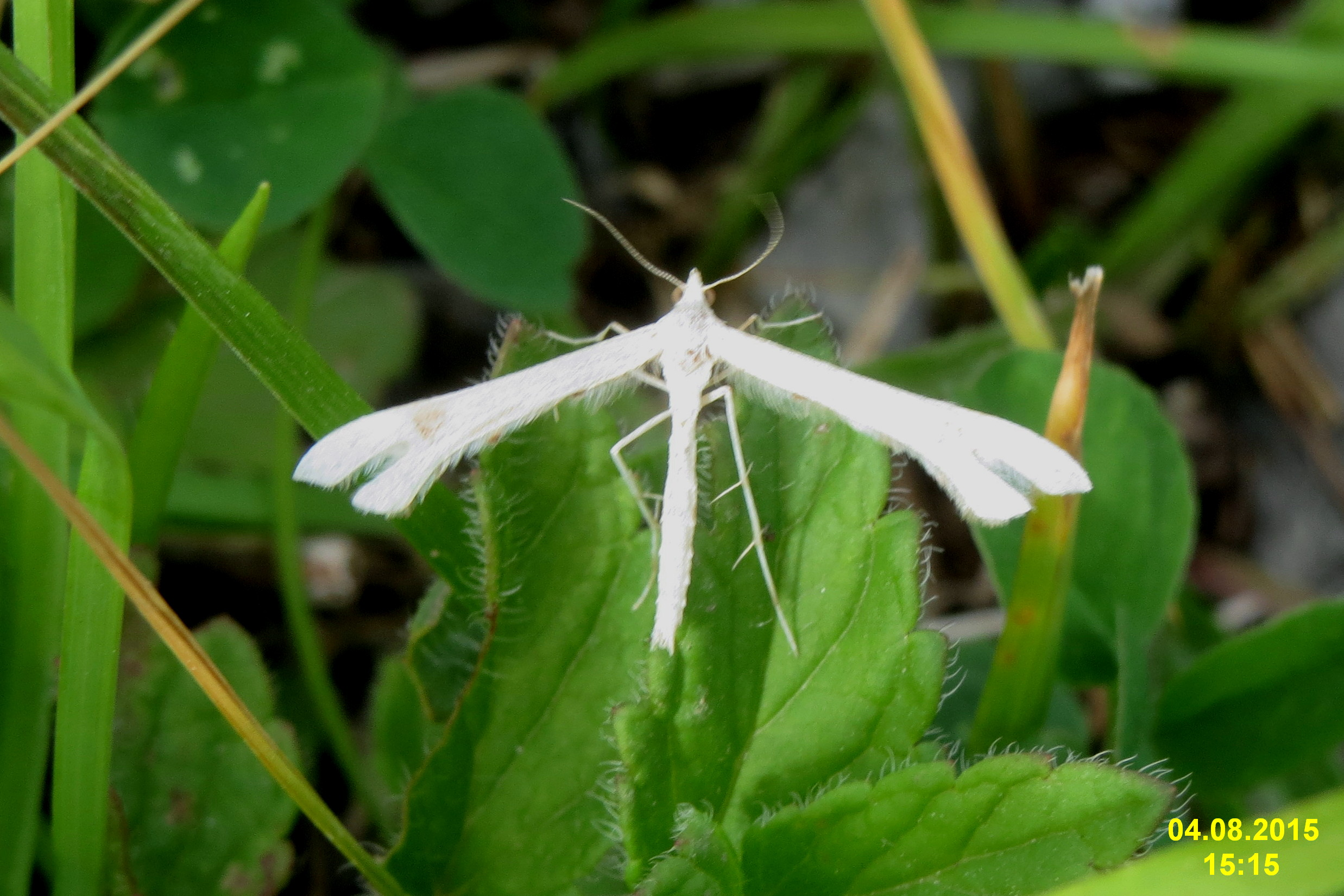

Scientific classification
- Kingdom: Animalia
- Phylum: Arthropoda
- Clade: Pancrustacea
- Class: Insecta
- Order: Lepidoptera
- Family: Pterophoridae
- Genus: Platyptilia
- Species: P. nemoralis

Binomial name
- Platyptilia nemoralis Zeller, 1841

Synonyms
- Platyptilia nemoralis var. saracenica Wocke, 1871; Platyptilia grafii Zeller, 1873; Platyptilia sinuosa Yano, 1960

= Platyptilia nemoralis =

Species of plume moth

Platyptilia nemoralis is a moth of the family Pterophoridae. It is found from Europe, through Russia to Japan.

The wingspan is 26–30 mm. Adults are on wing from early July to late August in western Europe. There is one generation per year.

The larvae feed on Senecio fuchsii, Senecio fluviatilis, Senecio sarracenicus and Senecio nemorensis. They feed in the shoots of their host plant. Pupation takes place in the feeding chambers.
