= Alpine flora =

Alpine flora may refer to:

- Alpine tundra, a community of plants that live at high altitude
- Alpine plants that live within that community
- Flora of the Alps
