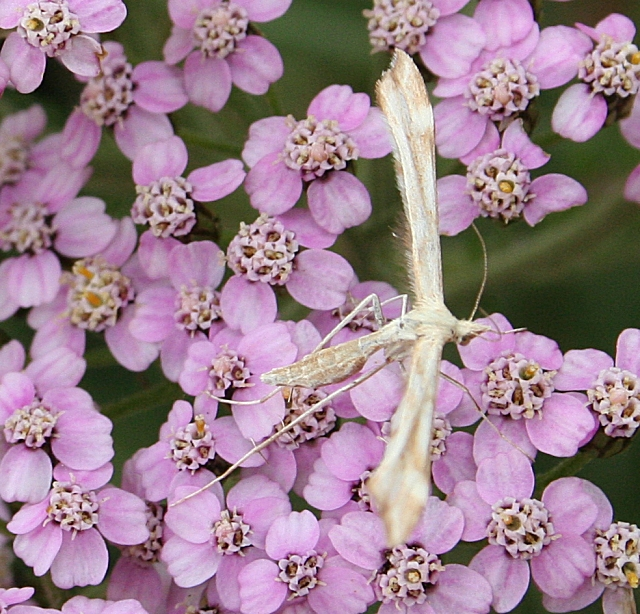

Scientific classification
- Domain: Eukaryota
- Kingdom: Animalia
- Phylum: Arthropoda
- Class: Insecta
- Order: Lepidoptera
- Family: Pterophoridae
- Genus: Hellinsia
- Species: H. osteodactyla

Binomial name
- Hellinsia osteodactyla (Zeller, 1841)

Synonyms
- List: Pterophorus osteodactylus Zeller, 1841; Leioptilus cinerariae Millière, 1869; Hellinsia osteodactylus auct.; Oidaematophorus osteodactylus; Leioptilus trimmatodactylus Christoph, 1872

= Hellinsia osteodactyla =

Species of plume moth

Hellinsia osteodactyla is a moth of the family Pterophoridae. It is found in most of Europe (except the Benelux, Iceland, Ireland and Greece), as well as North Africa and from Asia Minor to Japan. Also known as the small golden-rod plume it was first described by Philipp Christoph Zeller in 1841.

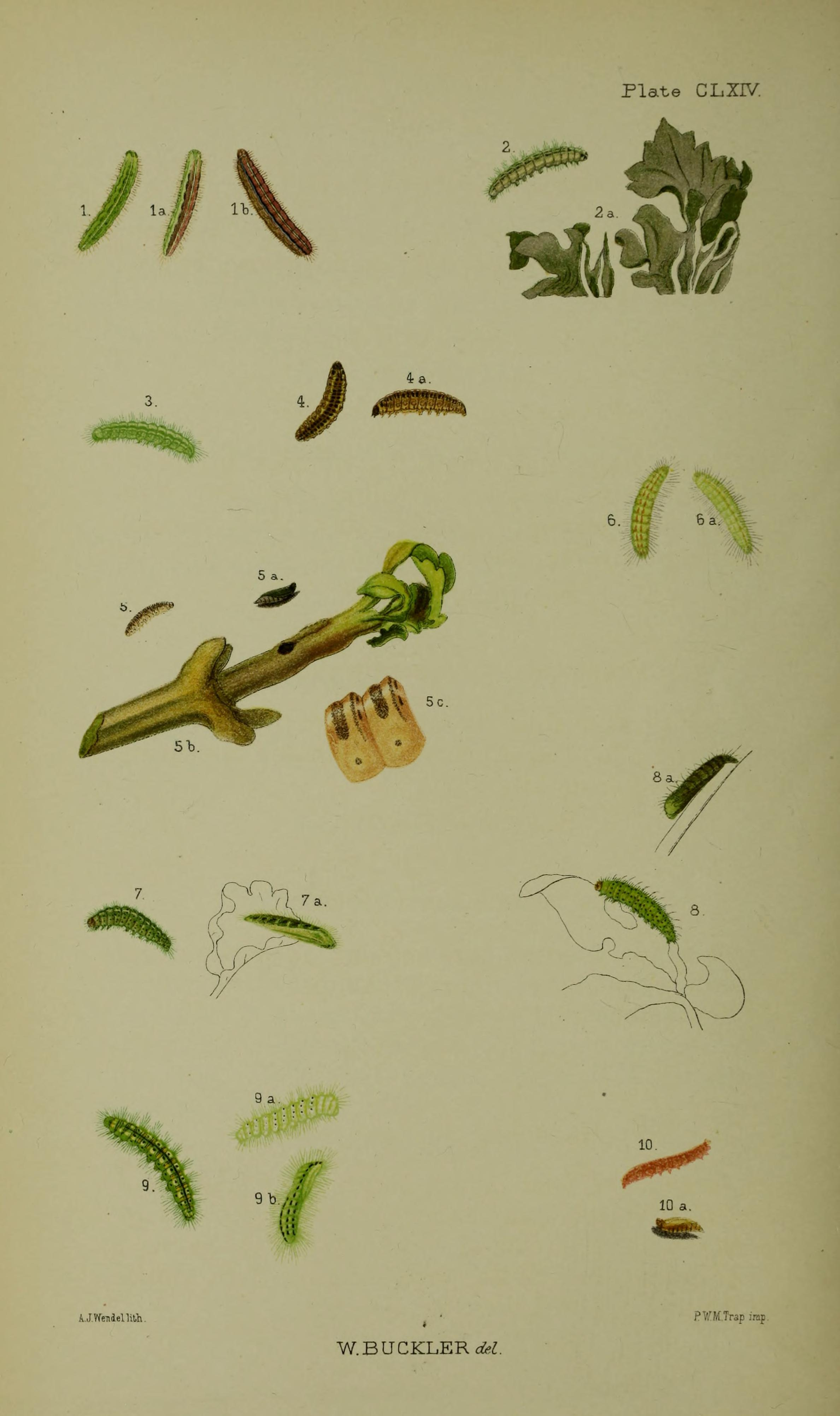
Figs.4, 4a larva after final moult

The wingspan is 16–23 millimetres (0.63–0.91 in). Adults are on wing at dusk in July and come to light.

The larvae feed on the flowers and seed-heads of European goldenrod (Solidago virgaurea), Senecio nemorensis, silver ragwort (Senecio bicolour) and goldilocks aster (Aster linosyris).
