= Carex gracilis =

Carex gracilis can refer to:

- Carex gracilis A.Gray, a synonym of Carex disperma Dewey
- Carex gracilis Curtis, a synonym of Carex acuta L.
- Carex gracilis Honck., a synonym of Carex mucronata All.
- Carex gracilis R.Br., a synonym of Carex lenta D.Don
- Carex gracilis Wimm., a synonym of Carex elata subsp. elata All.
