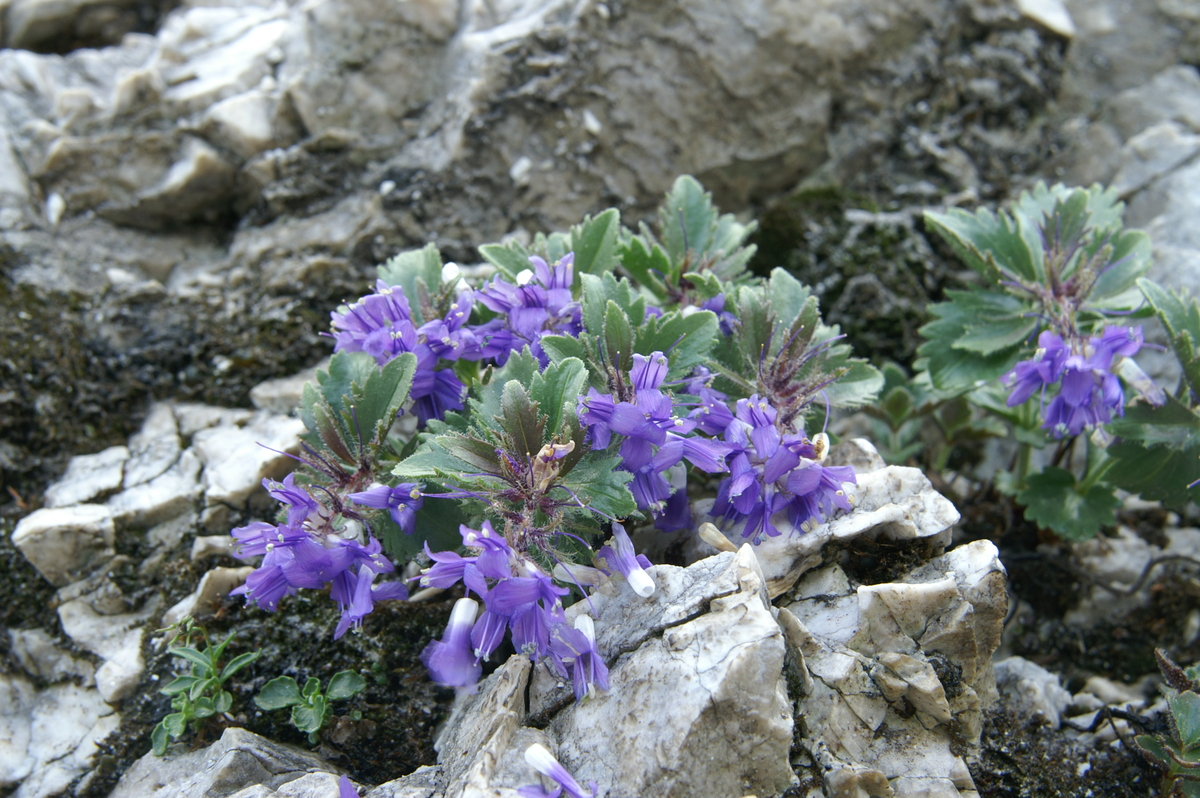
- Paederota bonarota

Scientific classification
- Kingdom: Plantae
- Clade: Tracheophytes
- Clade: Angiosperms
- Clade: Eudicots
- Clade: Asterids
- Order: Lamiales
- Family: Plantaginaceae
- Tribe: Veroniceae
- Genus: Paederota; L. (1758)

Species
- Paederota bonarota (L.) L.; Paederota lutea Scop.

Synonyms
- Bonarota Adans. (1763), nom. superfl.

= Paederota =

Genus of flowering plants

Paederota is a genus of flowering plants in the family Plantaginaceae. It includes two species native to the eastern Alps of Austria, Italy, and Slovenia.

- Paederota bonarota (L.) L.
- Paederota lutea Scop.
