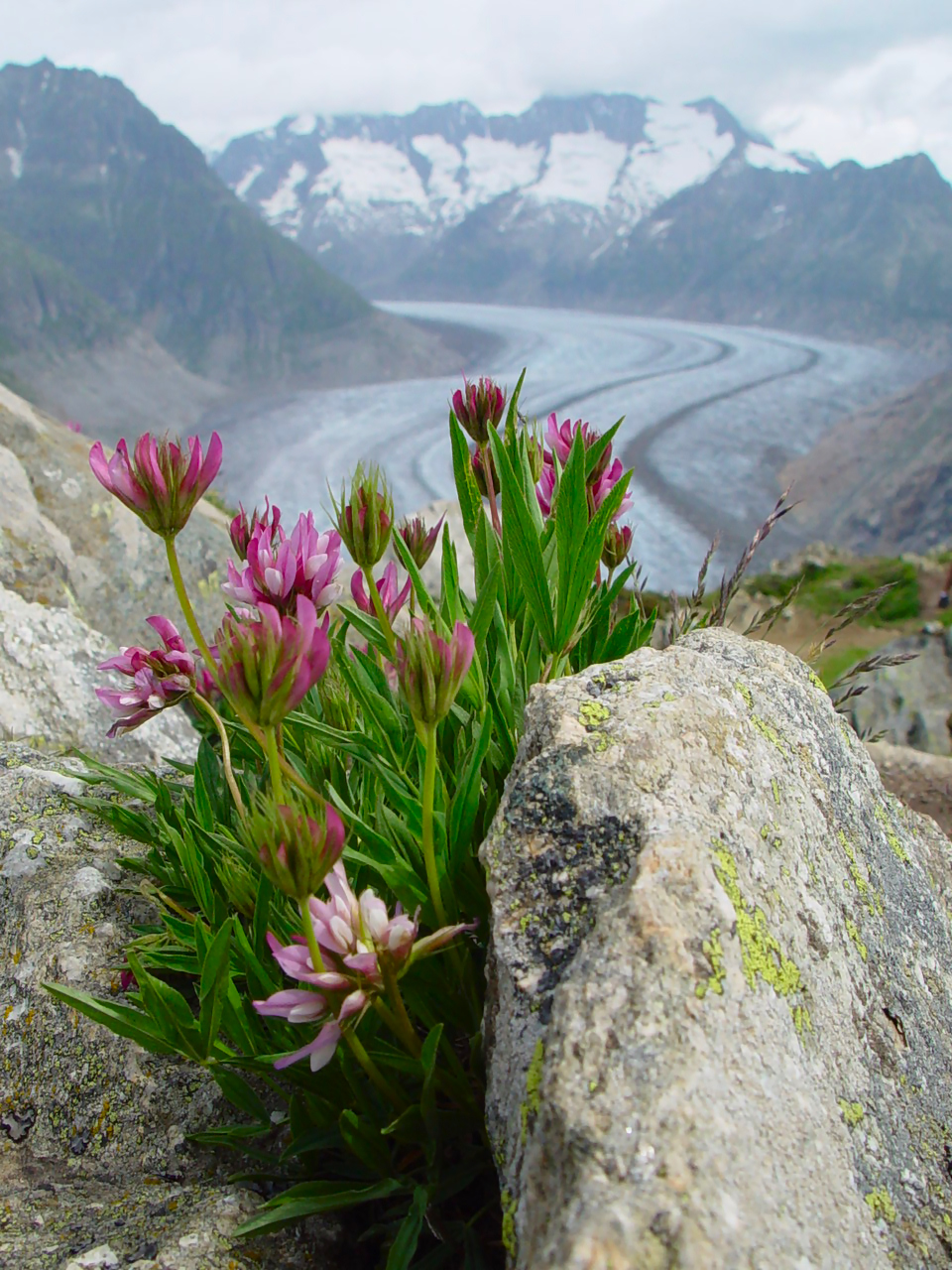

Conservation status
- Least Concern (IUCN 3.1)

Scientific classification
- Kingdom: Plantae
- Clade: Embryophytes
- Clade: Tracheophytes
- Clade: Angiosperms
- Clade: Eudicots
- Clade: Rosids
- Order: Fabales
- Family: Fabaceae
- Subfamily: Faboideae
- Genus: Trifolium
- Species: T. alpinum

Binomial name
- Trifolium alpinum L.

= Trifolium alpinum =

Species of flowering plant

Trifolium alpinum is a species of flowering plant in the legume family known by the common name alpine clover. It is native to the Alps.

== Distribution and habitat ==
This plant is a perennial herb with a large taproot which can be 1 metre (3 1/2 ft) long and 1 centimetre (1/2 in) wide. The short stems bear ternate leaves divided into three leaflets each up to 5 cm (2 in) long.

The flowers, which appear from June to August, are fragrant, 18–25 millimetres (3/4–1 in) long, and arranged in globose heads of up to 12 individual blossoms. The corolla is typically pink to light red, tinged with purple. The root has a distinct sweet flavour, similar to liquorice.

=== Chemistry ===
The flowers emit a strong fragrance, described as pleasant and spicy, that is also the main source of the distinctive aromas of the European alpine meadows during summer. This aroma is the result of a complex blend of volatile organic compounds. Research on alpine pastures dominated by the species has shown that its volatile profile is unusually rich for a member of the family Fabaceae, which is generally considered poor in such compounds. The plant's tissues also contain a variety of non-volatile phenolic compounds, including flavonoids, isoflavonoids, and clovamides.

== Distribution and habitat ==
Trifolium alpinum is native to the Alps, Pyrenees, and northern Apennines. It grows in subalpine and alpine climates at elevations between 1,700 and 2,800 metres (5,600 and 9,200 ft), sometimes as high as 3,100 m (10,200 ft). It is typically found in rocky meadows and poor alpine grasslands, preferring deep, warm, and nutrient-deficient acidic soils.

== Ecology ==
In alpine regions, T. alpinum provides an important forage for wild animals such as chamois and marmots. It also helps stabilize sites of erosion at high elevations.

The plant's strong fragrance is a multi-functional adaptation to its high-altitude environment. As a self-incompatible species, it relies entirely on insects for pollination and seed production. The potent scent acts as a long-range chemical beacon to attract pollinators, particularly honey bees and bumblebees.

The same volatile compounds that produce the scent may also serve as a chemical defense to deter herbivores. The production of secondary metabolites such as terpenes and phenolics is also a physiological response by alpine plants to cope with high levels of abiotic stress, including intense UV radiation.

== Uses ==
The species is valued as a nutrient-rich and digestible forage crop for livestock, including cattle and sheep. Due to its very deep taproot and nitrogen-fixing capabilities, the plant is used in ecological restoration projects to stabilize soil on eroded high-altitude slopes.

In ethnobotany, the plant is known for its sweet, liquorice-flavoured root, which was traditionally consumed as a confection in some alpine regions. In German folk medicine (Volksmedizin), a decoction of the root has been used to treat chest complaints.

=== Influence on dairy products ===
When T. alpinum is grazed by livestock, its unique chemical constituents are transferred to the resulting milk and dairy products. The plant's volatile compounds impart a distinct aroma and flavour to the milk, a phenomenon confirmed by studies using electronic sensors that can differentiate milk based on the pasture type. Furthermore, the specific profile of fatty acids and hydrocarbons from the clover serve as reliable chemical biomarkers in cheese. Cheeses made from the milk of cows grazing on T. alpinum can be identified by their higher content of odd-chain fatty acids (C15, C17) and a characteristic ratio of C29/C27 hydrocarbons. This direct transfer of compounds from plant to product scientifically substantiates the concept of terroir, where local flora contributes to the unique sensory qualities of regional alpine cheeses.
