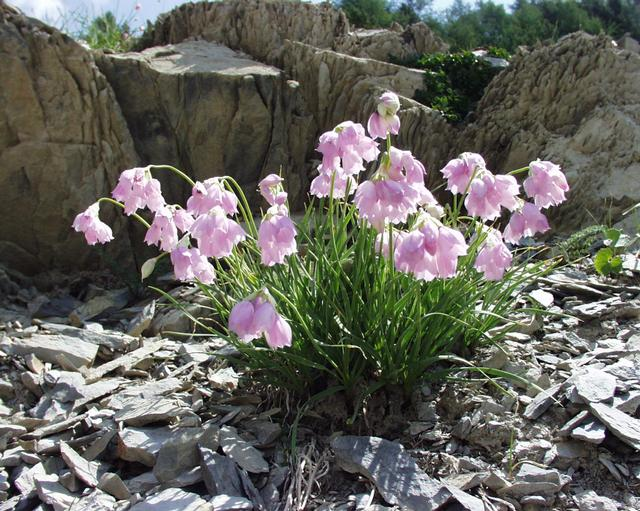

Conservation status
- Data Deficient (IUCN 3.1)

Scientific classification
- Kingdom: Plantae
- Clade: Tracheophytes
- Clade: Angiosperms
- Clade: Monocots
- Order: Asparagales
- Family: Amaryllidaceae
- Subfamily: Allioideae
- Genus: Allium
- Subgenus: A. subg. Amerallium
- Species: A. narcissiflorum

Binomial name
- Allium narcissiflorum Vill.

Synonyms
- Allium grandiflorum Lam.; Allium nigrum All. 1785, illegitimate homonym not L. 1762 nor M. Bieb. 1808 nor Sm. 1823; Allium pedemontanum Willd.; Moenchia narcissiflora (Vill.) Medik.

= Allium narcissiflorum =

Piedmont garlic Narcissus onion

Species of flowering plant

Allium narcissiflorum is a European species of wild onion native to northwestern Italy (Piemonte and Liguria), southwest France (Provence and Dauphiné). It is grown in other regions as an ornamental because of its pretty flowers.

Allium narcissiflorum is a small and delicate plant very similar to A. insubricum but found at higher elevation in the mountains. In A. insubricum, the umbel is nodding (hanging downward) at flowering time and remaining nodding when the seeds are mature. In A. narcissiflorum, however, the umbel is nodding at flowering time but erect at maturity.

Allium narcissiflorum forms clumps of many individuals, spreading by means of underground rhizomes. Scapes up to 15 cm tall bearing 4-10 bell-shaped magenta flowers.
