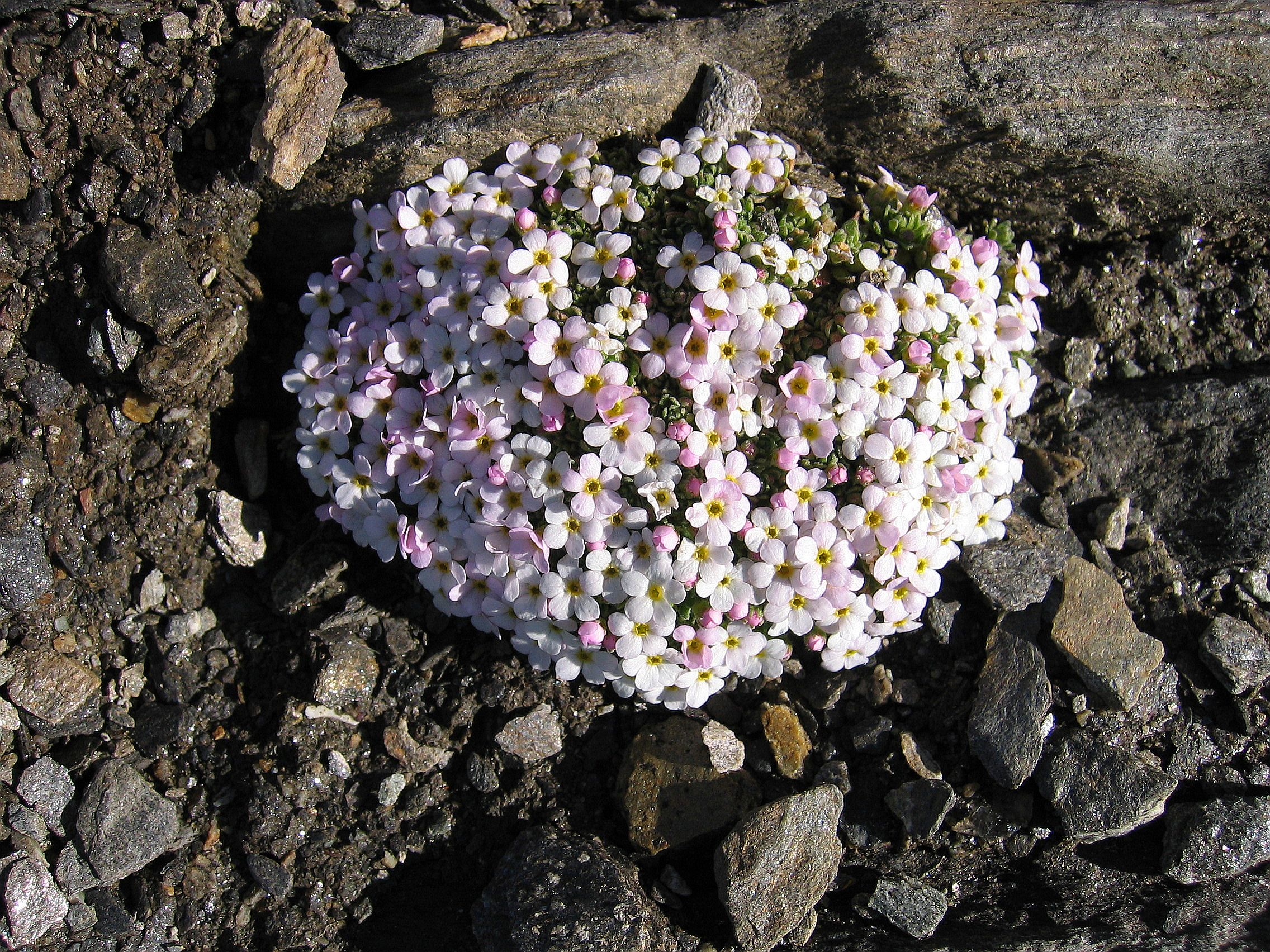
- A typical Androsace alpina cushion in flower

Scientific classification
- Kingdom: Plantae
- Clade: Embryophytes
- Clade: Tracheophytes
- Clade: Angiosperms
- Clade: Eudicots
- Clade: Asterids
- Order: Ericales
- Family: Primulaceae
- Genus: Androsace
- Species: A. alpina

Binomial name
- Androsace alpina (L.) Lam.

Synonyms
- Aretia alpina L.; Androsace glacialis Hoppe; Androsace tiroliensis F.Wettst.

= Androsace alpina =

Species of flowering plant

Androsace alpina, or Alpine rock-jasmine, is an alpine plant, endemic to the Alps. The plant forms distinctive cushion-like mats up to 20 cm across, with small overlapping leaves arranged in rosettes and bearing fine glandular hairs that help conserve water. It inhabits specialized high-alpine environments between 2,500 and 3,200 metres elevation, favouring well-drained limestone or dolomite scree and crevices primarily on south-facing slopes, where its cushion growth form creates a protective microclimate in these harsh conditions.

== Description ==
The flowers of A. alpina are white or pink (often both on the same plant), and in the short flowering season can be so densely packed that they completely shade the foliage. The plant forms dense, cushion-like mats that can reach up to 20 cm across, each composed of numerous small, overlapping leaves arranged in tight rosettes. Individual leaves are lanceolate, measuring about 5–10 mm in length, and bear fine glandular hairs that help limit water loss and discourage herbivores. In mid summer, each cushion produces one or more short flowering stems, each topped by a solitary, five-petalled flower measuring roughly 8–12 mm across. The flowers open only under direct sunlight and close in overcast conditions or at dusk, a behaviour that protects the reproductive organs from cold and moisture.

== Habitat and distribution ==
This species is endemic to high-alpine zones of the European Alps, occurring exclusively at elevations between 2,500 and 3,200 metres. It favours shallow soils lodged in rock crevices or loose scree—loose fragments of limestone or dolomite—that offer excellent drainage and prevent root waterlogging during snowmelt. The cushion growth form creates a more stable microclimate by trapping heat and reducing wind exposure, vital adaptations in an environment where even summer nights can drop below freezing. Surveys demonstrate that A. alpina shows a strong preference for south- to south-east-facing aspects on initial lithosols, where shallow soils in rock fissures and gravelly slopes maximise solar exposure and minimise frost persistence. Because A. alpina relies on such specialised habitats and has a limited range, it is vulnerable to the effects of climate warming and disturbance from recreational activities in alpine areas.

== Plant communities ==
Within its narrow range, A. alpina contributes to high-alpine cushion-plant assemblages that occupy sun-exposed lithosols in rock crevices and gravel fields. In the Julian Alps, comparable cushion communities have been classified into two principal associations: a scree-grassland association dominated by Achnatherum calamagrostis (Stipetum calamagrostis) and a stony grassland association characterised by Carex mucronata and Aquilegia einseleana (Aquilegio einseleanae–Caricetum mucronatae). These plant communities host a suite of diagnostic species—such as Globularia cordifolia, Carduus crassifolius and Epilobium dodonaei—reflecting a transitional habitat between scree, chasmophytic niches and alpine grasslands.
