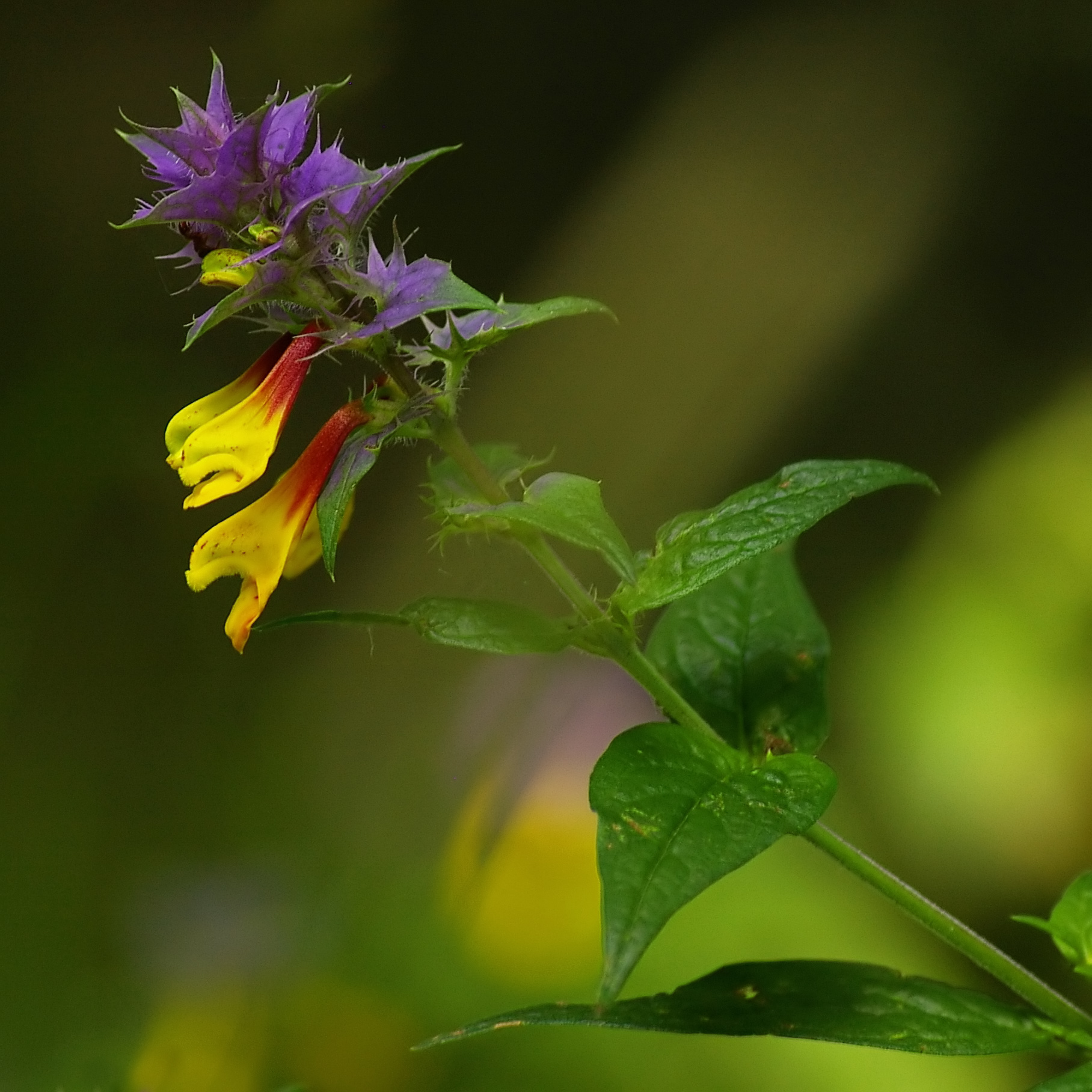

Scientific classification
- Kingdom: Plantae
- Clade: Tracheophytes
- Clade: Angiosperms
- Clade: Eudicots
- Clade: Asterids
- Order: Lamiales
- Family: Orobanchaceae
- Genus: Melampyrum
- Species: M. nemorosum

Binomial name
- Melampyrum nemorosum L.

= Melampyrum nemorosum =

Species of flowering plant

Wood cow-wheat (Melampyrum nemorosum) is an herbaceous flowering plant in the family Orobanchaceae. It is native to Europe. In Sweden it is called natt och dag (Night and Day). In Russia it is called Ivan-da-Marya (Ivan and Maria), a Christianisation of the traditional Slavic Kupalo-da-Mavka (Kupalo-and-Mavka).

This is an annual plant. The new leaves are blue, turning green as they mature. They are usually toothed at the bases.

This plant is a host to the rust fungus Coleosporium melampyri und Cronartium flaccidum with the associated uredium and telium.

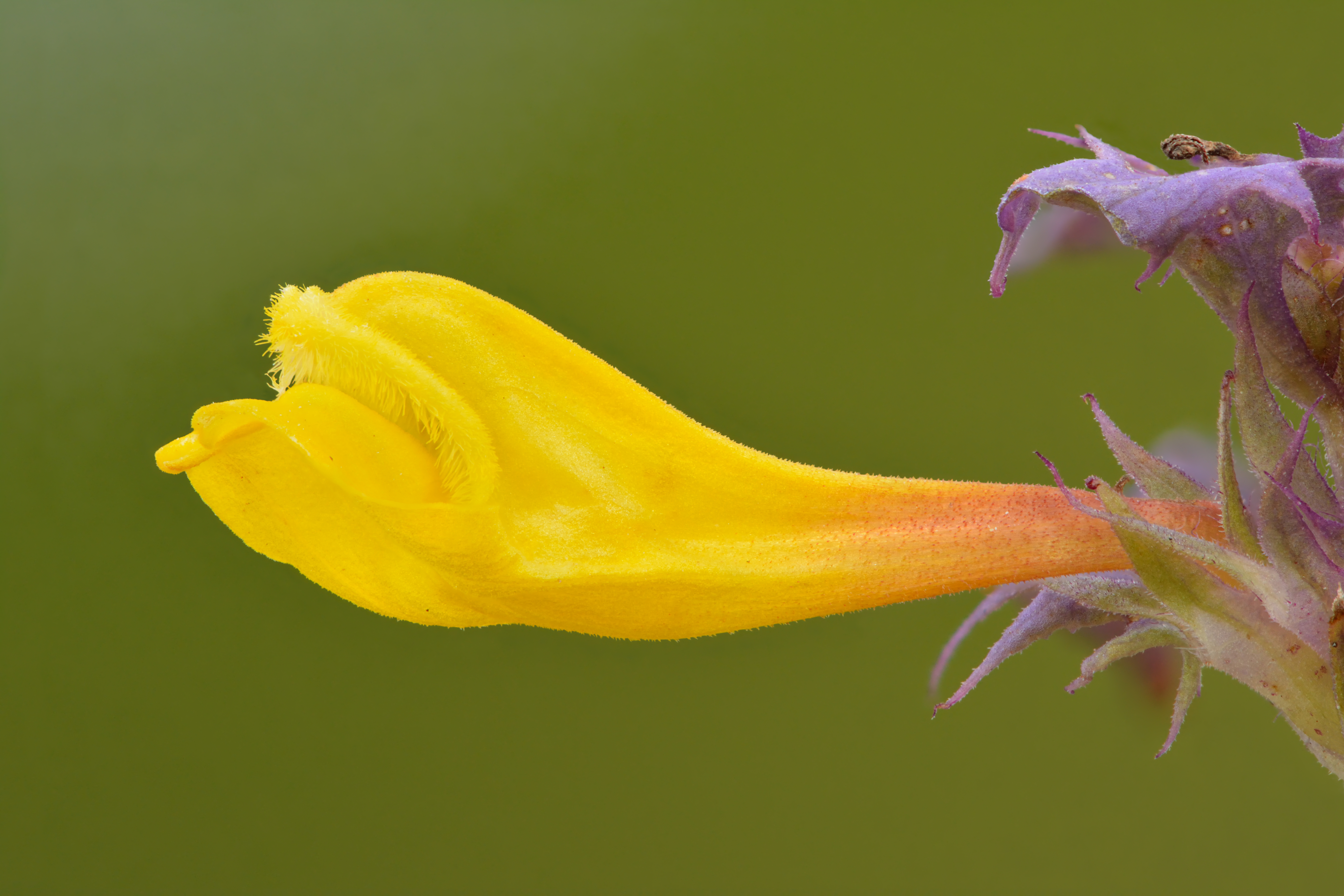
Flower

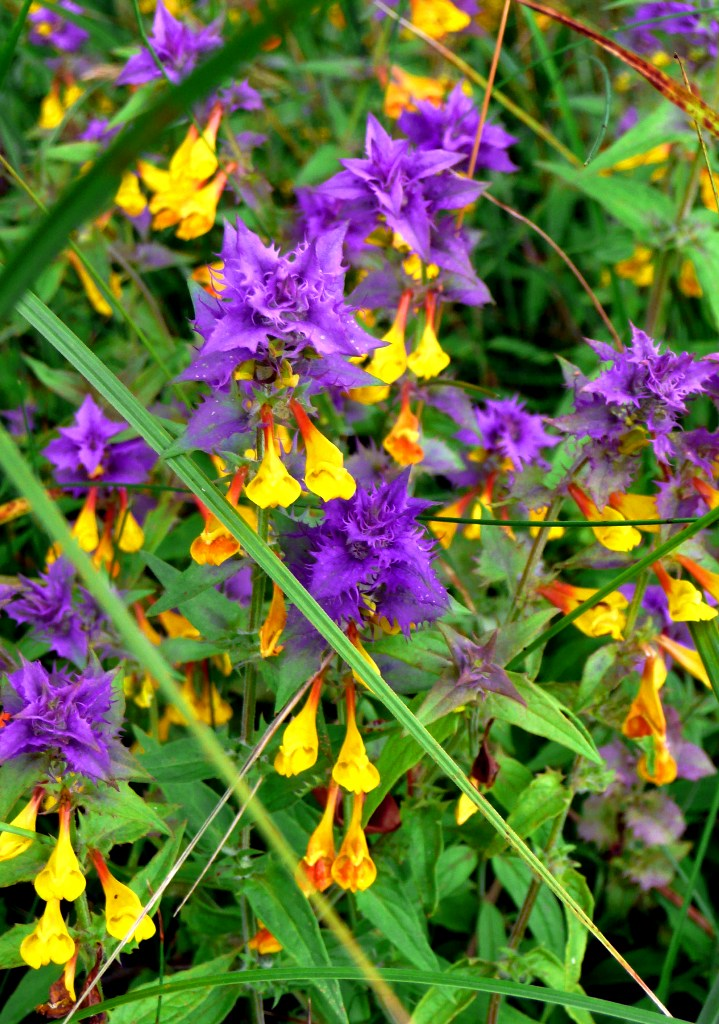
Flowers in yellow and red contrast the purple top leaves
