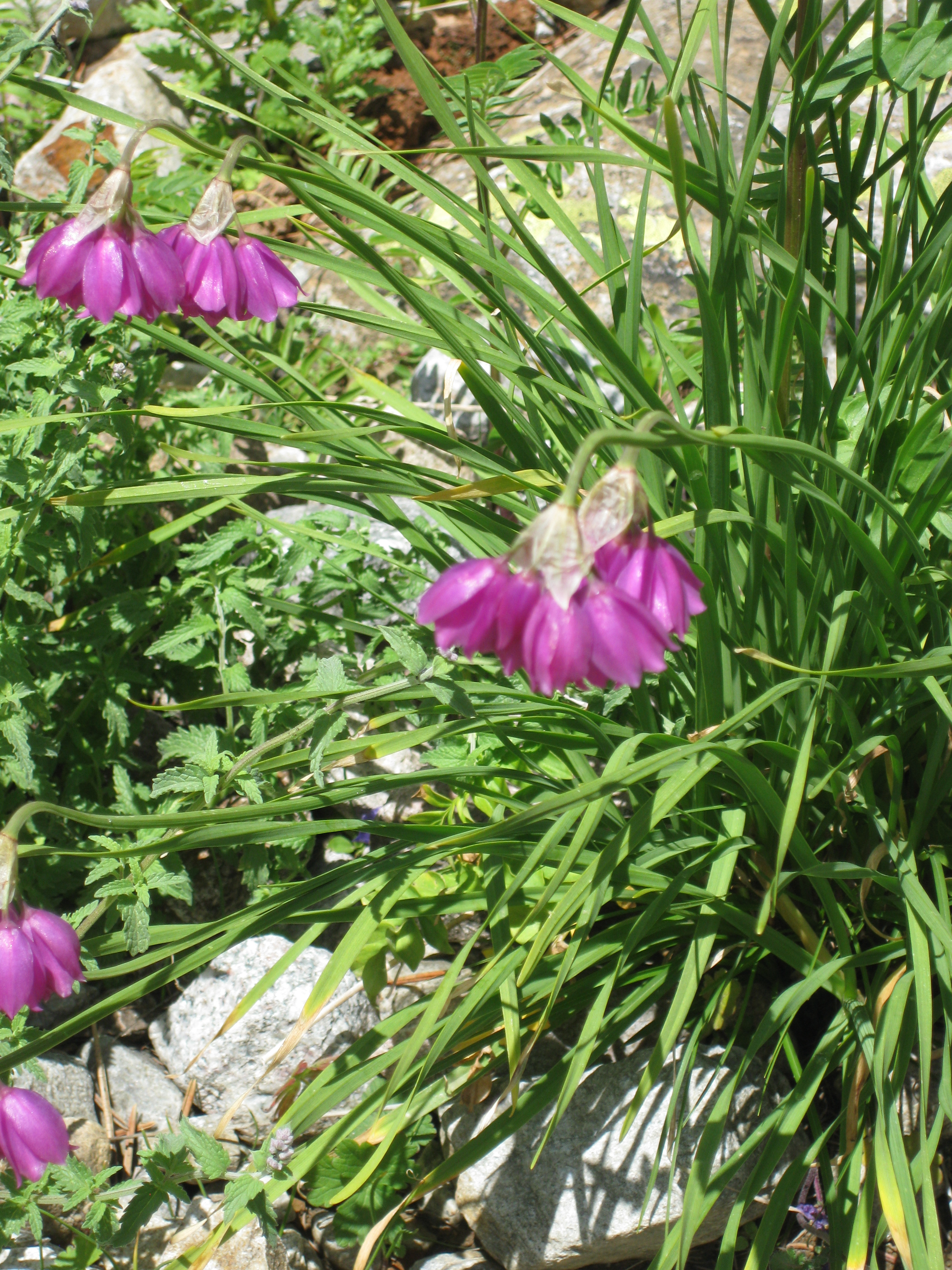

Scientific classification
- Kingdom: Plantae
- Clade: Embryophytes
- Clade: Tracheophytes
- Clade: Spermatophytes
- Clade: Angiosperms
- Clade: Monocots
- Order: Asparagales
- Family: Amaryllidaceae
- Subfamily: Allioideae
- Genus: Allium
- Subgenus: A. subg. Amerallium
- Species: A. insubricum

Binomial name
- Allium insubricum Boiss. & Reut.

Synonyms
- Allium narcissiflorum var. insubricum (Boiss. & Reut.) Fiori; Allium narcissiflorum subsp. insubricum (Boiss. & Reut.) Nyman

= Allium insubricum =

Lombardy garlic

Species of flowering plant

Allium insubricum, the Lombardy garlic, is a species of flowering plant endemic to the Lombardy region in northern Italy. It is named for Insubria, the ancient name for the area around present-day Milan. The species is, however, widely cultivated as an ornamental because of its striking flowers. Its locus classicus is located in Canzo.

Allium insubricum is a bulbous herbaceous perennial belonging to the genus Allium, which includes all the culinary and ornamental onions and garlic. It grows up to 25 cm (9.8 in) tall. It has flat, linear leaves up to 10 mm across, tapering toward the tip. The scape is hooked at the top, so that the umbel as a whole is nodding (hanging downward). The flowers are few, usually no more than five per umbel, but much larger than most other species in the genus. The tepals are rosy pink.

This plant has gained the Royal Horticultural Society's Award of Garden Merit. It prefers a position in full sun.

Allium narcissiflorum is very similar to A. insubricum but found at higher elevation in the mountains. In A. insubricum, the umbel is nodding (hanging downward) at flowering time and remaining nodding when the seeds are mature. In A. narcissiflorum, however, the umbel is nodding at flowering time but erect at maturity.

Like most bulbous plants it is usually planted as a dry bulb in the autumn. However, it is also possible to grow from seed.
