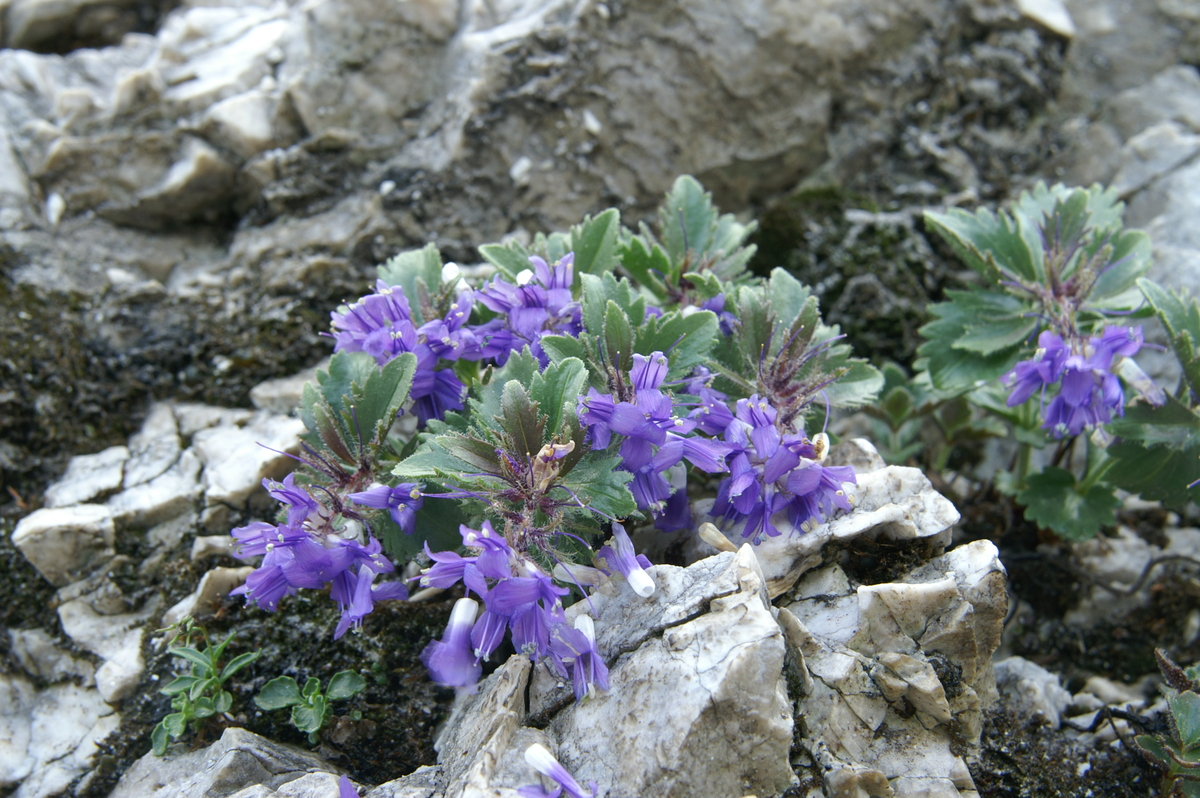

Scientific classification
- Kingdom: Plantae
- Clade: Tracheophytes
- Clade: Angiosperms
- Clade: Eudicots
- Clade: Asterids
- Order: Lamiales
- Family: Plantaginaceae
- Genus: Paederota
- Species: P. bonarota

Binomial name
- Paederota bonarota (L.) L.

Synonyms
- Bonarota chamaedrifolia Scop. (1771), nom. superfl.; Bonarota rotundifolia Caruel (1885); Paederota caerulea Scop. (1769); Paederota chamaedrifolia Suffren (1802), nom. superfl.; Veronica bonarota L. (1753); Wulfenia bonarota (L.) Sm. (1802); Wulfenia bonarota var. rotundifolia Vahl (1804); Wulfenia chamaedrifolia Host (1827), nom. superfl.

= Paederota bonarota =

Species of flowering plant

Paederota bonarota is a species of flowering plant in the family Plantaginaceae. It is a perennial native to the eastern Alps of Italy, Austria, and Slovenia, where it grows only on dolomite.

The species was first named Veronica bonarota in Carl Linnaeus' 1753 Species Plantarum. In 1762 Linnaeus renamed the plant Paederota bonarota.
