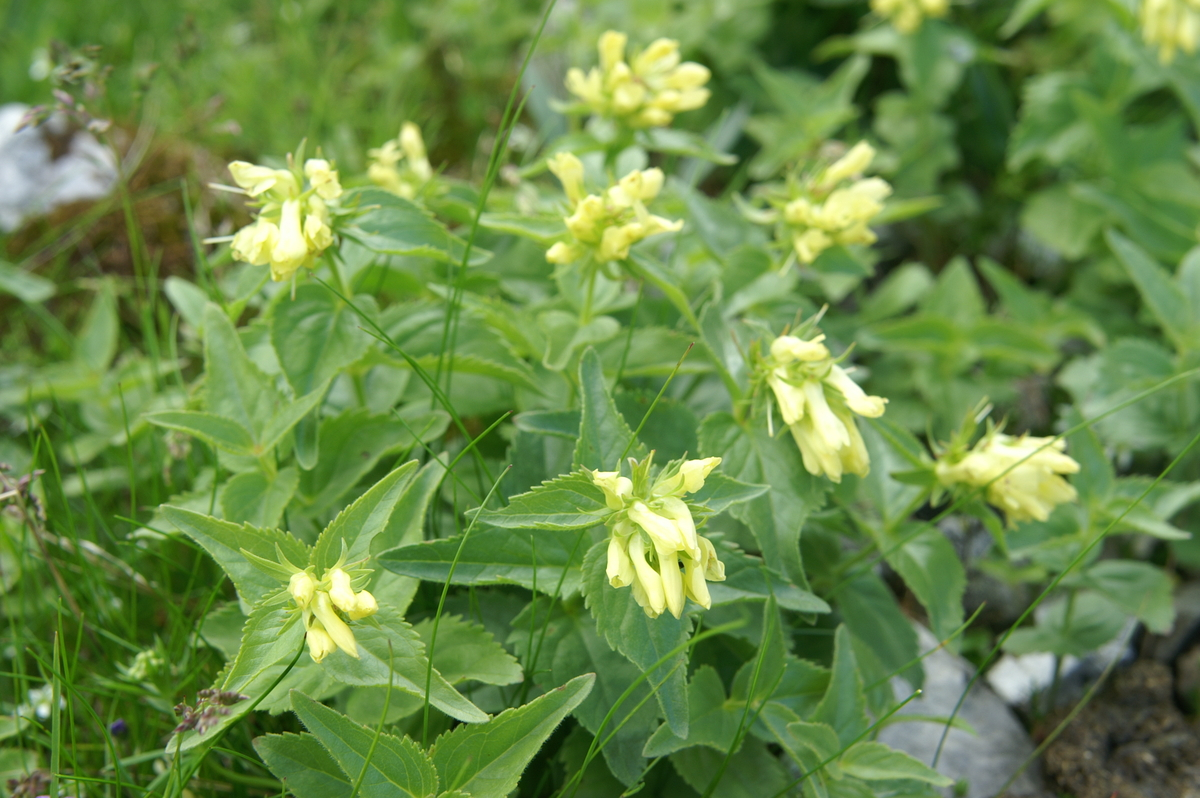

Scientific classification
- Kingdom: Plantae
- Clade: Tracheophytes
- Clade: Angiosperms
- Clade: Eudicots
- Clade: Asterids
- Order: Lamiales
- Family: Plantaginaceae
- Genus: Paederota
- Species: P. lutea

Binomial name
- Paederota lutea Scop. (1769)

Synonyms
- Paederota ageria L. (1771), nom. superfl.; Paederota bonarota Jacq. (1772), sensu auct.; Paederota urticifolia Brign. (1810); Paederota zannichellii Brign. (1810); Veronica lutea (Scop.) Wettst. (1891); Wulfenia ageria Sm. (1802), nom. superfl.; Wulfenia lutea (Scop.) Host (1827)

= Paederota lutea =

Species of flowering plant

Paederota lutea is a species of flowering plant in the family Plantaginaceae. It is a perennial native to the eastern Alps of Italy, Austria, and Slovenia.
