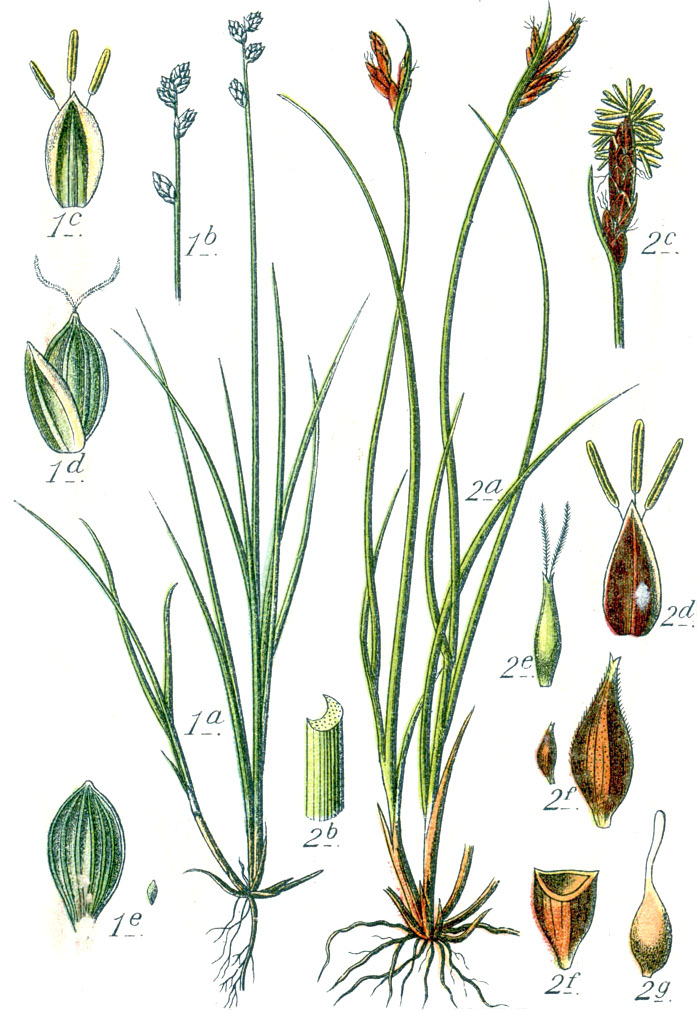

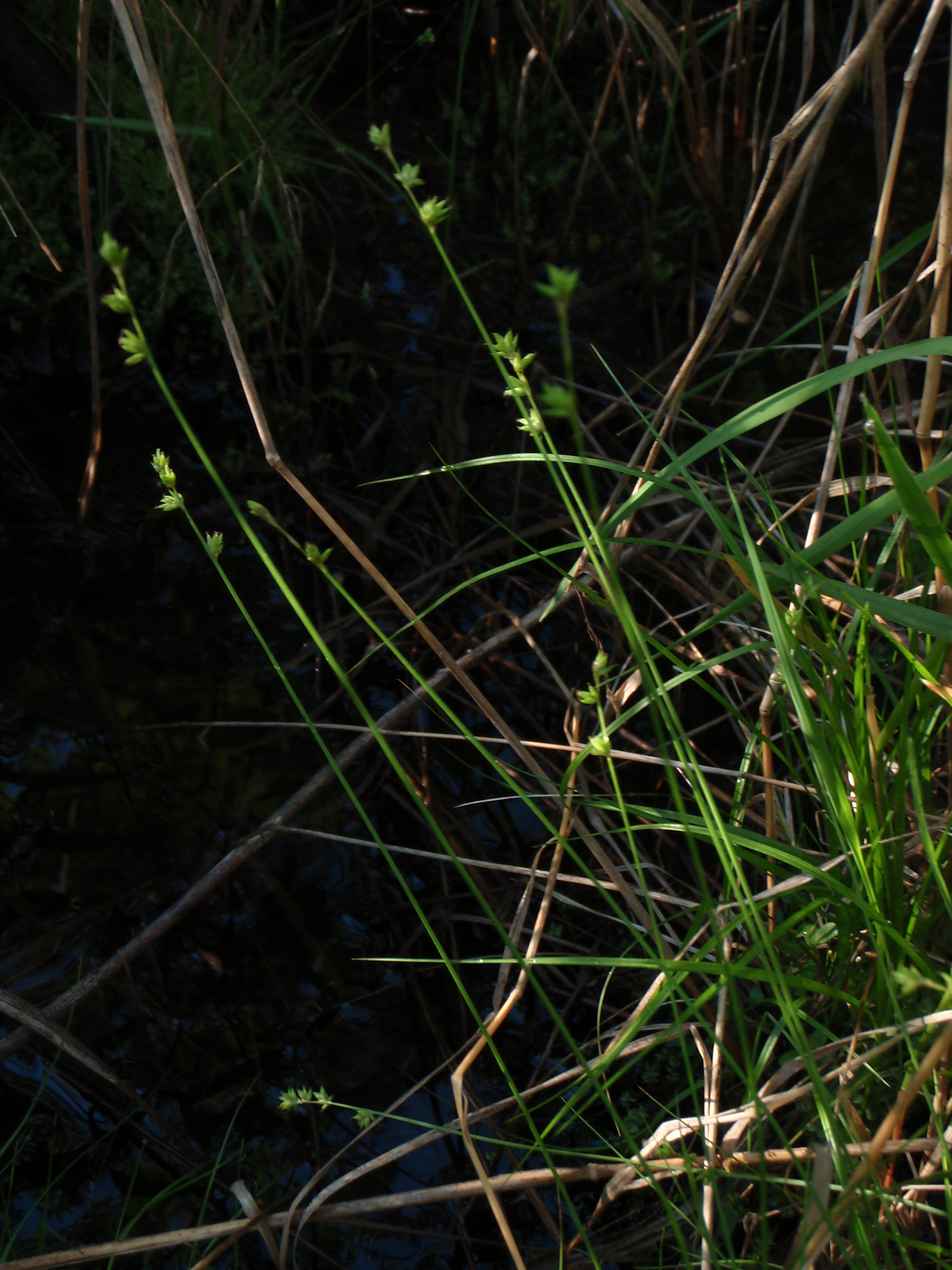

Conservation status
- Least Concern (IUCN 3.1)

Scientific classification
- Kingdom: Plantae
- Clade: Tracheophytes
- Clade: Angiosperms
- Clade: Monocots
- Clade: Commelinids
- Order: Poales
- Family: Cyperaceae
- Genus: Carex
- Species: C. loliacea

Binomial name
- Carex loliacea Linnaeus

Synonyms
- Leptovignea loliacea (L.) Fedde & J.Schust.; Neskiza loliacea (L.) Raf.; Vignea loliacea (L.) Rchb.; Carex loliacea f. subtenella Norm.; Carex quaternaria Spreng.; Carex sibirica Willd. ex Kunth; Carex tenuiflora Hartm. ex Kunth

= Carex loliacea =

Species of grass-like plant in the sedge family

Carex loliacea (common name, ryegrass sedge) is a species of flowering plant in the family Cyperaceae.

== Description ==
Carex loliacea is a tussock-forming, grasslike plant, typically reaching 15–25cm in height. Stems are loosely tufted, growing from light brown, bladeless sheaths. Leaves are smooth, bladed and shorter than the stem. Inflorescence takes the form of a spike. The fruit is a red-brown achene.

== Distribution and habitat ==
Its native range is Northern and Eastern Central Europe to Japan, Subarctic America to Canada. It favours wetland conditions such as wet forests, marshes, river banks and fens.
