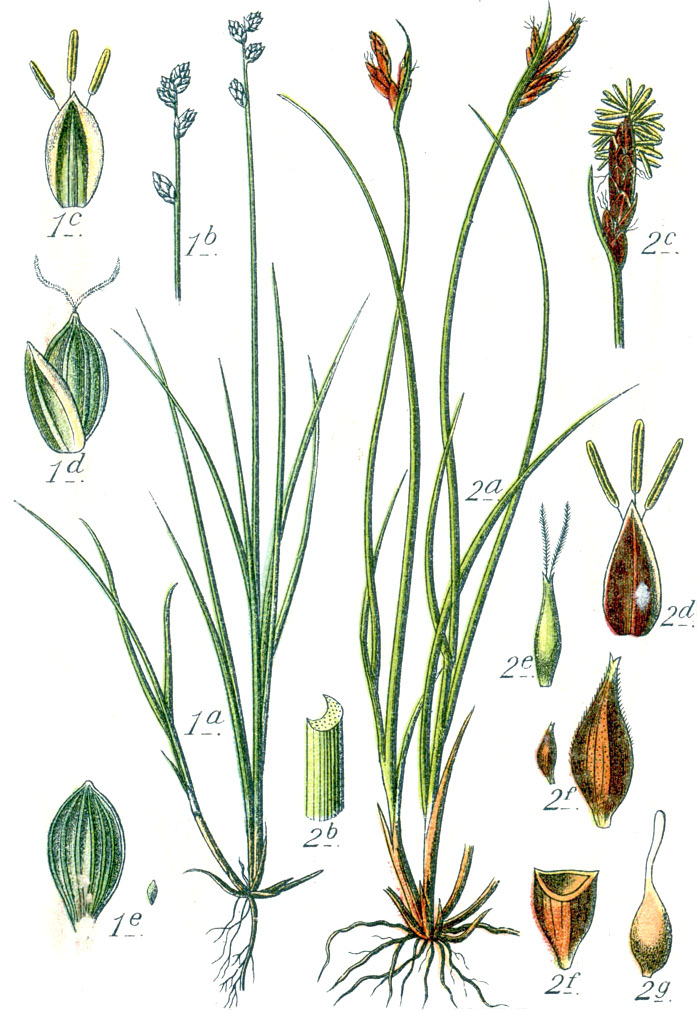
- Botanical illustration (with Carex loliacea on the left)

Scientific classification
- Kingdom: Plantae
- Clade: Tracheophytes
- Clade: Angiosperms
- Clade: Monocots
- Clade: Commelinids
- Order: Poales
- Family: Cyperaceae
- Genus: Carex
- Species: C. mucronata

Binomial name
- Carex mucronata All.

Synonyms
- List: Carex bracteata Suter; Carex gracilis Honck.; Carex illustranda Steud.; Carex juncifolia J.F.Gmel.; Carex nitida Hoppe; Edritria mucronata (All.) Raf.; Vignantha mucronata (All.) Schur; Vignea mucronata (All.) Rchb.

= Carex mucronata =

Species of grass-like plant

Carex mucronata is a species of flowering plant in the genus Carex, native to the mountains of Austria, France, Germany, Italy, Switzerland, and the former Yugoslavia. Its chromosome number is 2n=36, with one report of 34.
