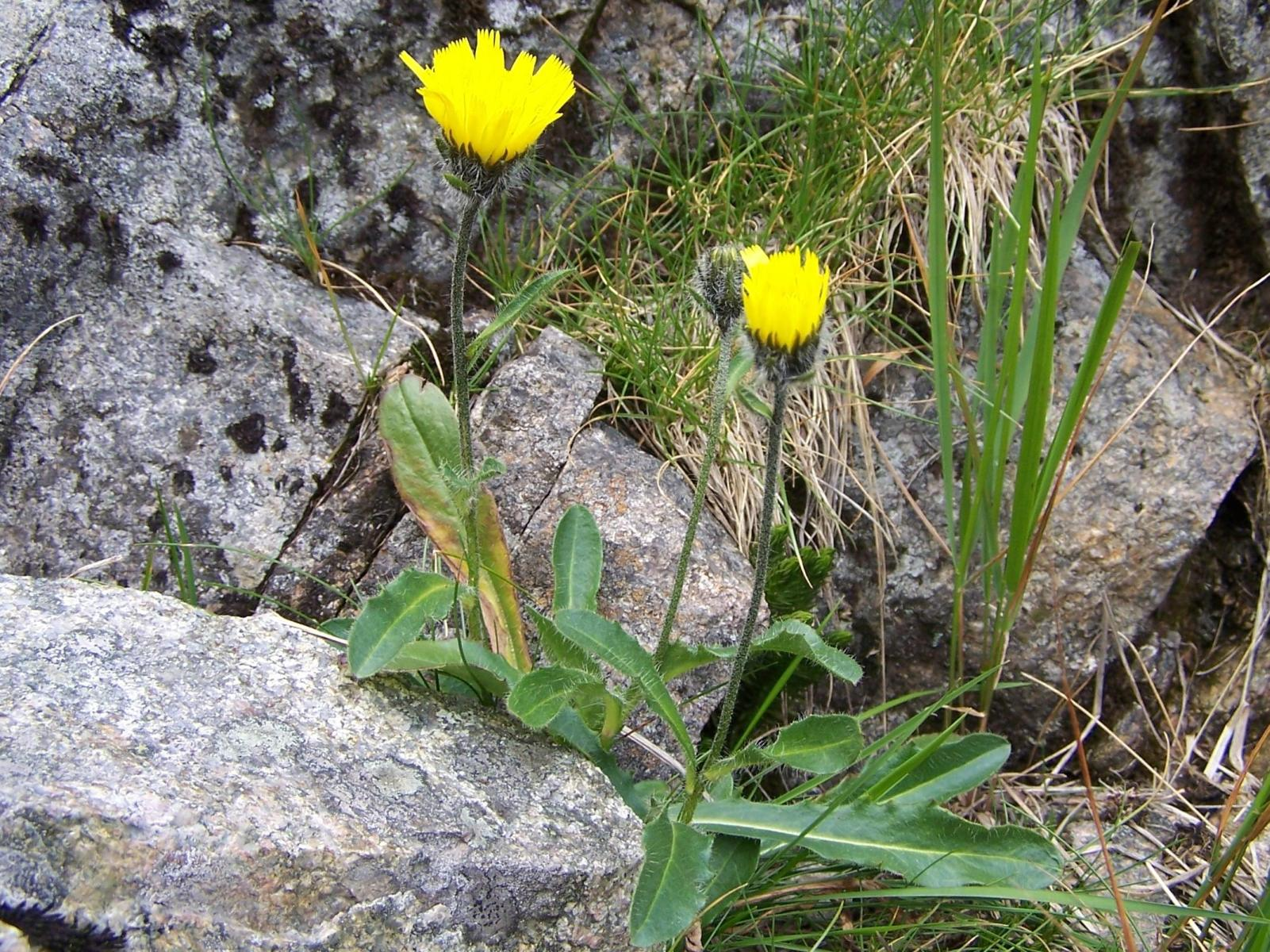

Scientific classification
- Kingdom: Plantae
- Clade: Tracheophytes
- Clade: Angiosperms
- Clade: Eudicots
- Clade: Asterids
- Order: Asterales
- Family: Asteraceae
- Genus: Hieracium
- Species: H. alpinum

Binomial name
- Hieracium alpinum L. 1753

Synonyms
- Hieracium angmagssalikense Omang; Hieracium crispum Elfstr.; Hieracium pumilum Hoppe ex Willd.; Hieracium augusti-bayeri (Zlatník) Chrtek f.; Hieracium gymnogenum (Zahn) Üksip; Hieracium tubulosum (Tausch) Tausch

= Hieracium alpinum =

Species of flowering plant

Hieracium alpinum, the alpine hawkweed, is a Eurasian plant species in the tribe Cichorieae within the family Asteraceae. It is native to Europe, and has also been found in Greenland.

Hieracium alpinum is an herb up to 25 cm (9.8 in) tall, with leaves mostly in a rosette at the bottom. Leaves are lance-shaped, up to 8 cm (3.1 in) long. One stalk will usually produce only one flower head, though occasionally 2 or 3. Each head has 80-120 yellow ray flowers but no disc flowers.
