= Clovamide =

- cis-Clovamide

- trans-Clovamide

Names
- IUPAC name (2S)-3-(3,4-Dihydroxyphenyl)-2-[[(Z)-3-(3,4-dihydroxyphenyl)prop-2-enoyl]amino]propanoic acid
- Other names N-Caffeoyl-L-DOPA

Identifiers
CAS Number	53755-03-6 (cis); 53755-02-5 (trans)
3D model (JSmol)	Interactive image
ChemSpider	4947752
PubChem CID	6443790
UNII	WZC65G68KW (cis); 973626KV9L (trans)
- InChI: InChI=1S/C18H17NO7/c20-13-4-1-10(8-15(13)22)3-6-17(24)19-12(18(25)26)7-11-2-5-14(21)16(23)9-11/h1-6,8-9,12,20-23H,7H2,(H,19,24)(H,25,26)/b6-3-/t12-/m0/s1 Key: GPZFXSWMDFBRGS-RYBZSIHZSA-N; InChI=1/C18H17NO7/c20-13-4-1-10(8-15(13)22)3-6-17(24)19-12(18(25)26)7-11-2-5-14(21)16(23)9-11/h1-6,8-9,12,20-23H,7H2,(H,19,24)(H,25,26)/b6-3-/t12-/m0/s1 Key: GPZFXSWMDFBRGS-RYBZSIHZBZ
- SMILES: c1cc(c(cc1C[C@@H](C(=O)O)NC(=O)/C=C\c2ccc(c(c2)O)O)O)O

Properties
Chemical formula	C_{18}H_{17}NO_{7}
Molar mass	359.334 g·mol^{−1}
- Except where otherwise noted, data are given for materials in their standard state (at 25 °C [77 °F], 100 kPa). Infobox references

Clovamide is a chemical compound found in cacao. It has only been found in small amounts. It is also found in Trifolium pratense (red clover).

Clovamide can exist as either the cis- or trans- isomer.

In isolated neuroblastoma cells, clovamide has in vitro neuroprotective effects.

== See also ==
- Rosmarinic acid
