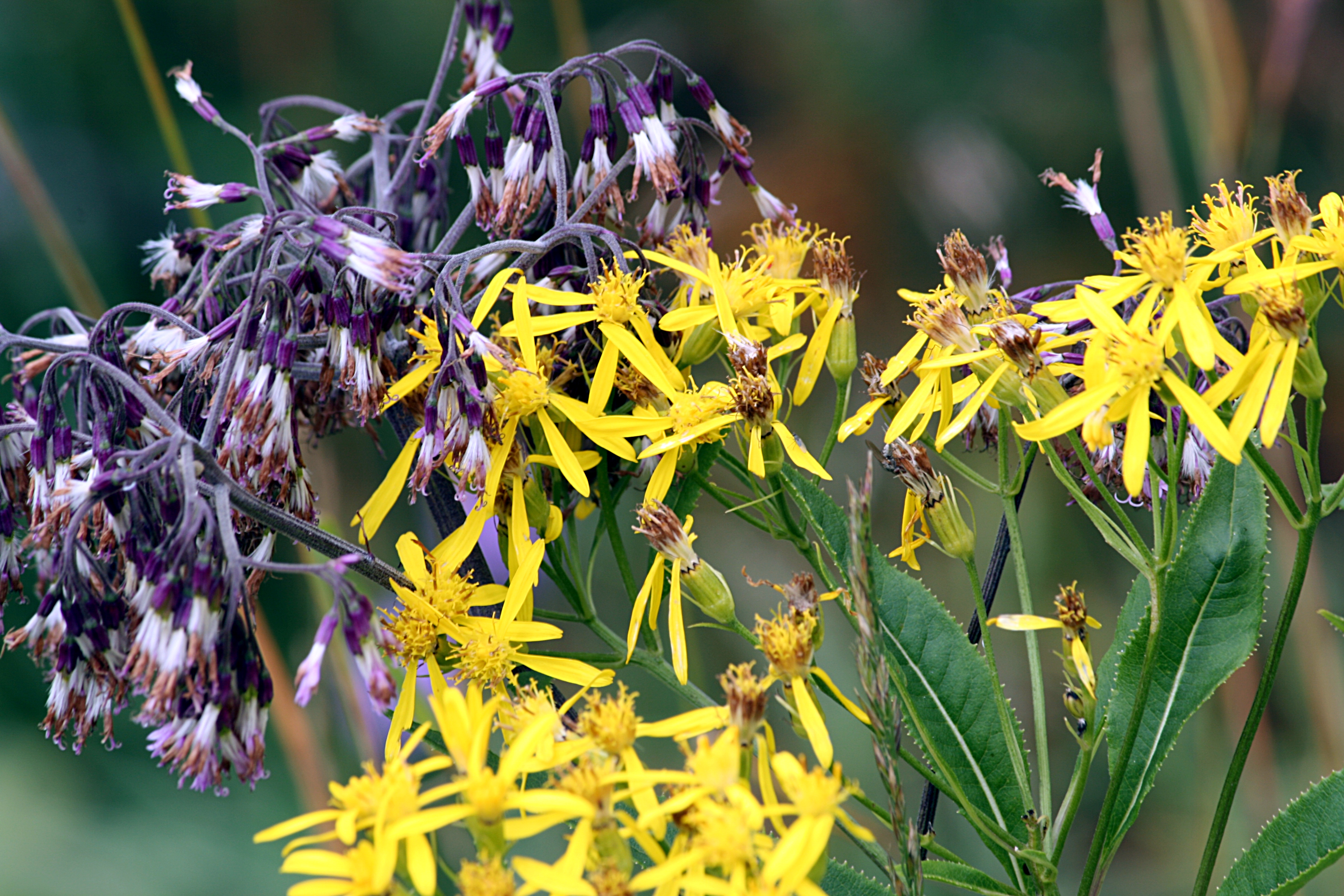
- Purple and yellow coloured Senecio nemorensis

Scientific classification
- Kingdom: Plantae
- Clade: Tracheophytes
- Clade: Angiosperms
- Clade: Eudicots
- Clade: Asterids
- Order: Asterales
- Family: Asteraceae
- Genus: Senecio
- Species: S. nemorensis

Binomial name
- Senecio nemorensis L.

= Senecio nemorensis =

Species of flowering plant

Senecio nemorensis is a species of perennial plant from the family Asteraceae that can reach 2 metres (6 ft 7 in) in height. The plant is native to Europe and Asia, where it can be found growing at elevation 800–1,800 metres (2,600–5,900 ft).
