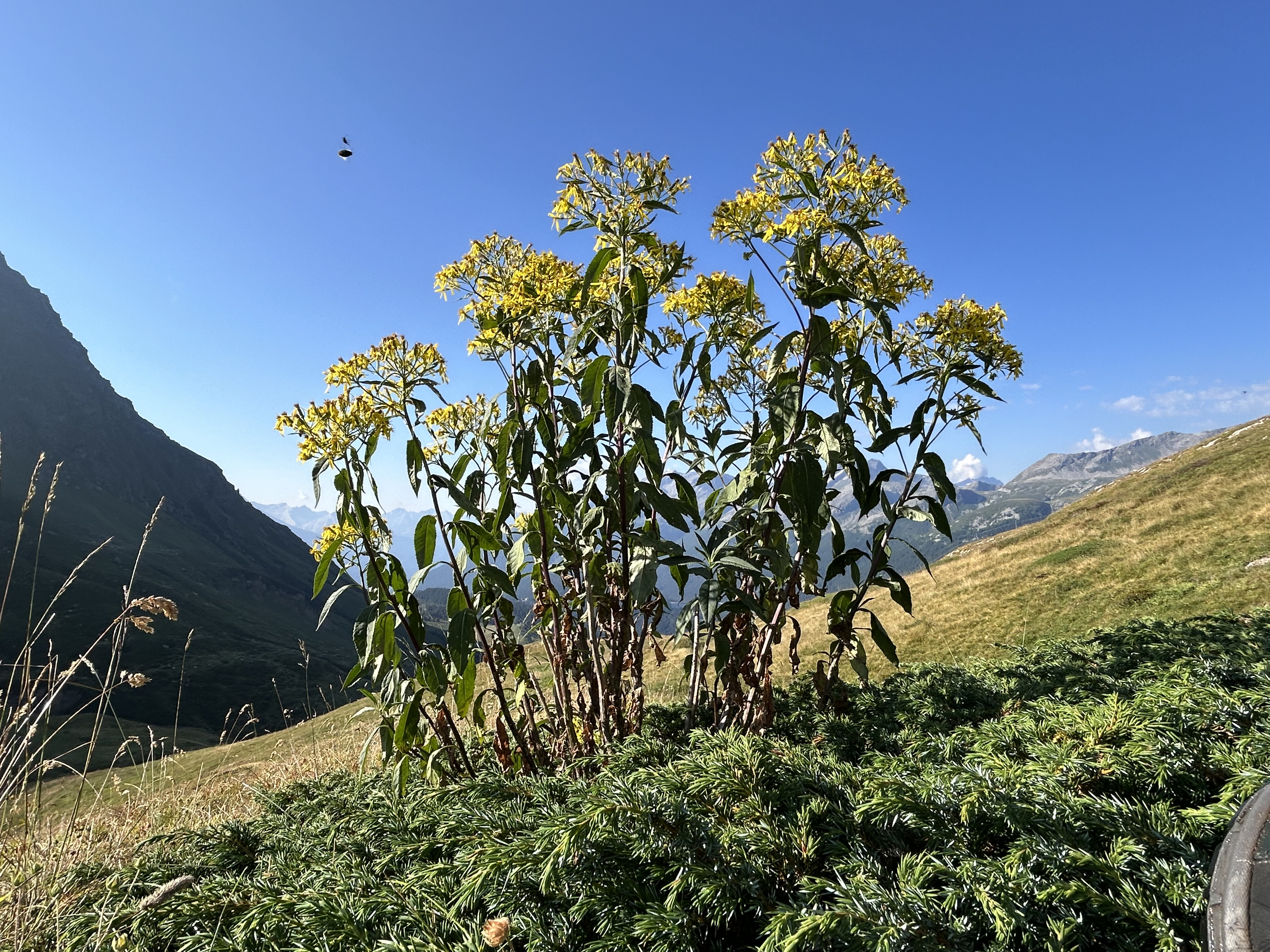
- Senecio ovatus

Scientific classification
- Kingdom: Plantae
- Clade: Tracheophytes
- Clade: Angiosperms
- Clade: Eudicots
- Clade: Asterids
- Order: Asterales
- Family: Asteraceae
- Genus: Senecio
- Species: S. ovatus

Binomial name
- Senecio ovatus (G. Gaertn. & Al.) Willd.

Synonyms
- Senecio fuchsii Gmelin; Jacobaea ovata G. Gaertn. & Al. (1801)

= Senecio ovatus =

Species of flowering plant

Senecio ovatus, common name wood ragwort, is a perennial herbaceous plant belonging to the family Asteraceae.

== Description ==
Senecio ovatus can reach a height of 50–150 centimetres (20–59 in). The stems are erect and hairless, while leaves are oblong, lanceolate and finely serrated. Flowers are light yellow. The flowering season is from July to September.

== Distribution ==
Senecio ovatus is present in central Europe.

== Habitat ==
This plant grows on uncultivated lands, along waterfronts and in the undergrowth of rich, shady and moist forests, at en elevation of 200–2,000 metres (660–6,560 ft) above sea level.

== Subspecies ==
- Senecio ovatus (P. Gaertner, Meyer & Scherb.) Willd. subsp. ovatus
- Senecio ovatus subsp. alpestris (Gaudin) Herborg

== Gallery ==
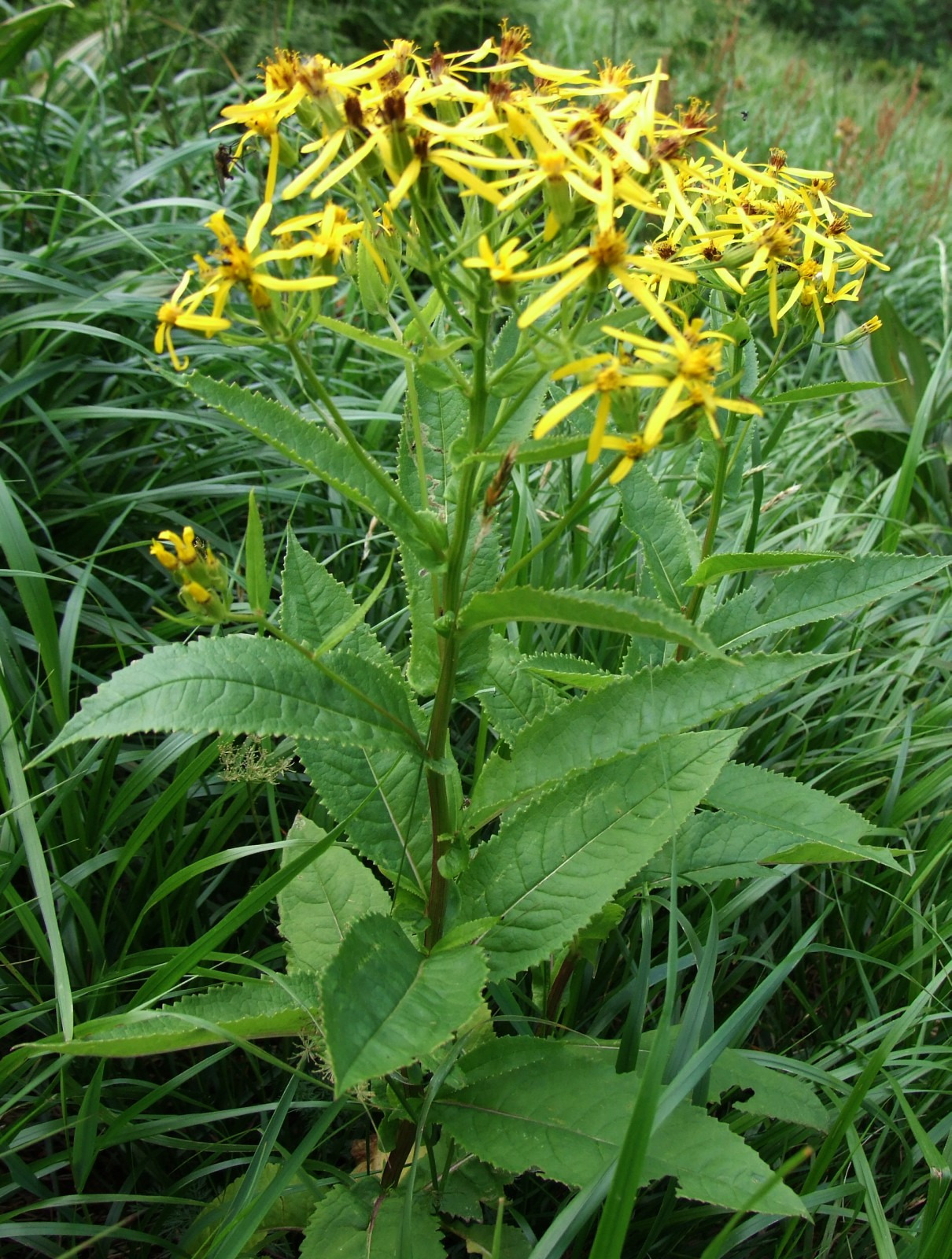
Plant of Senecio ovatus

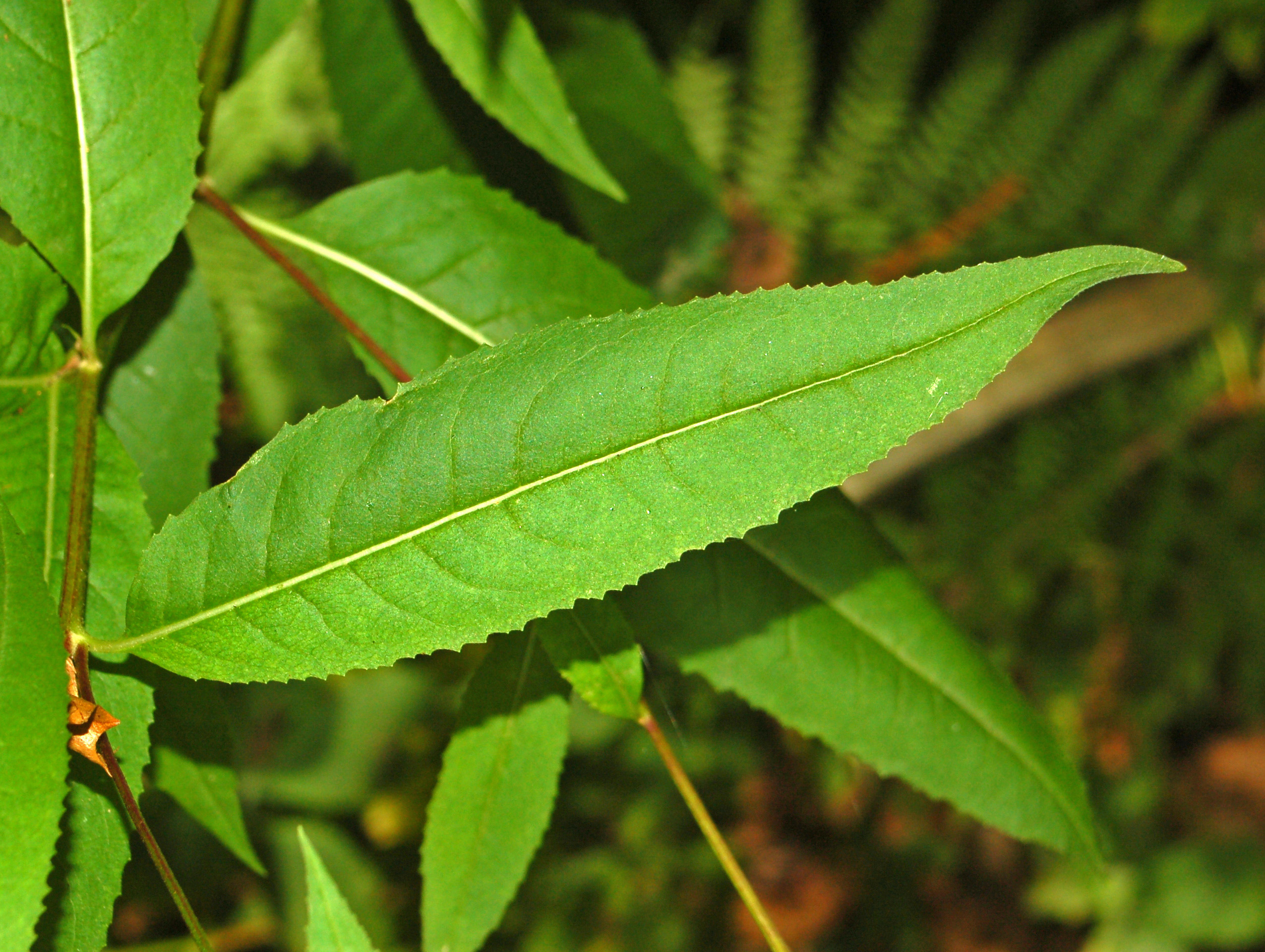
Leaf

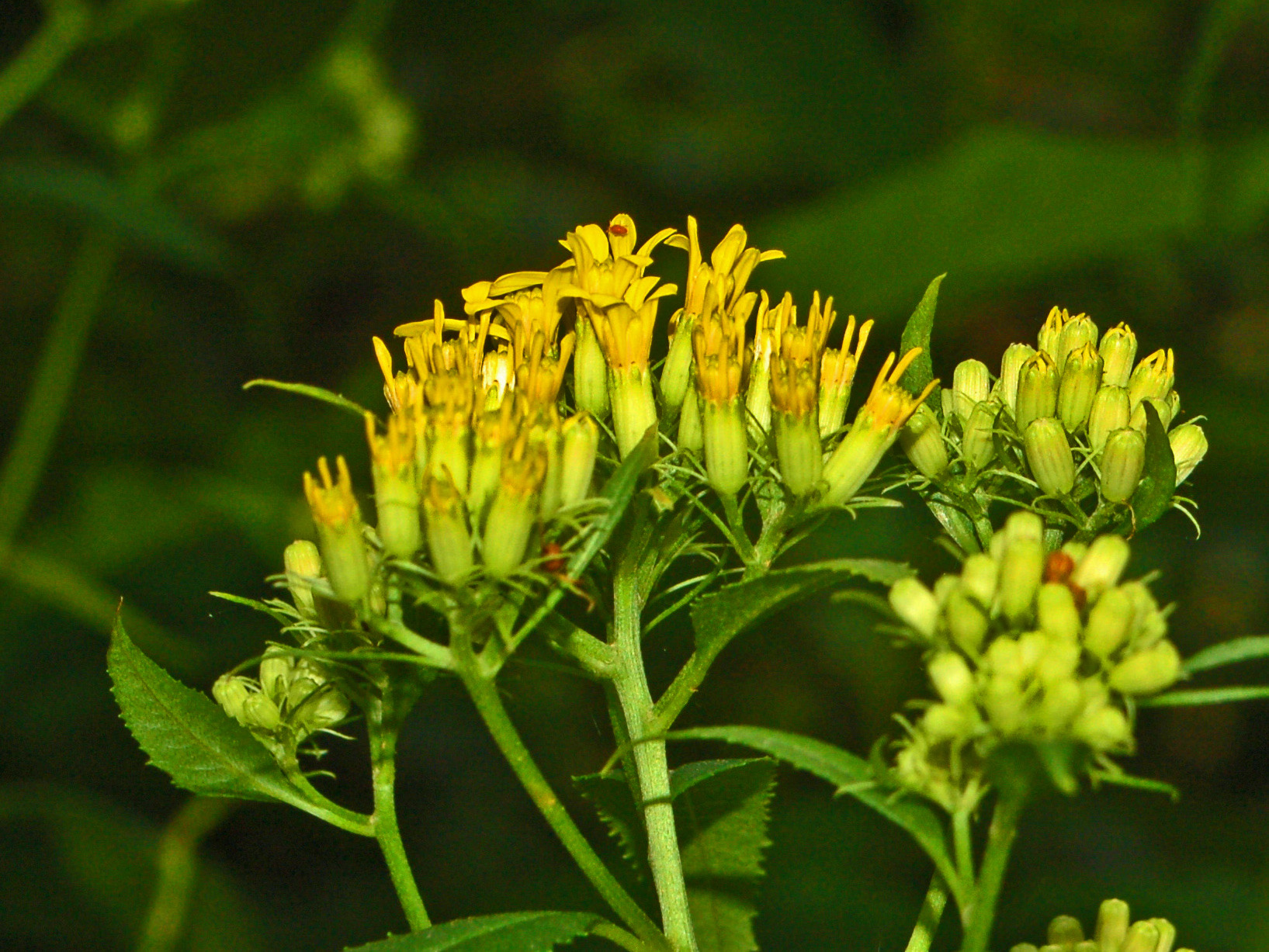
Flowers, lateral view

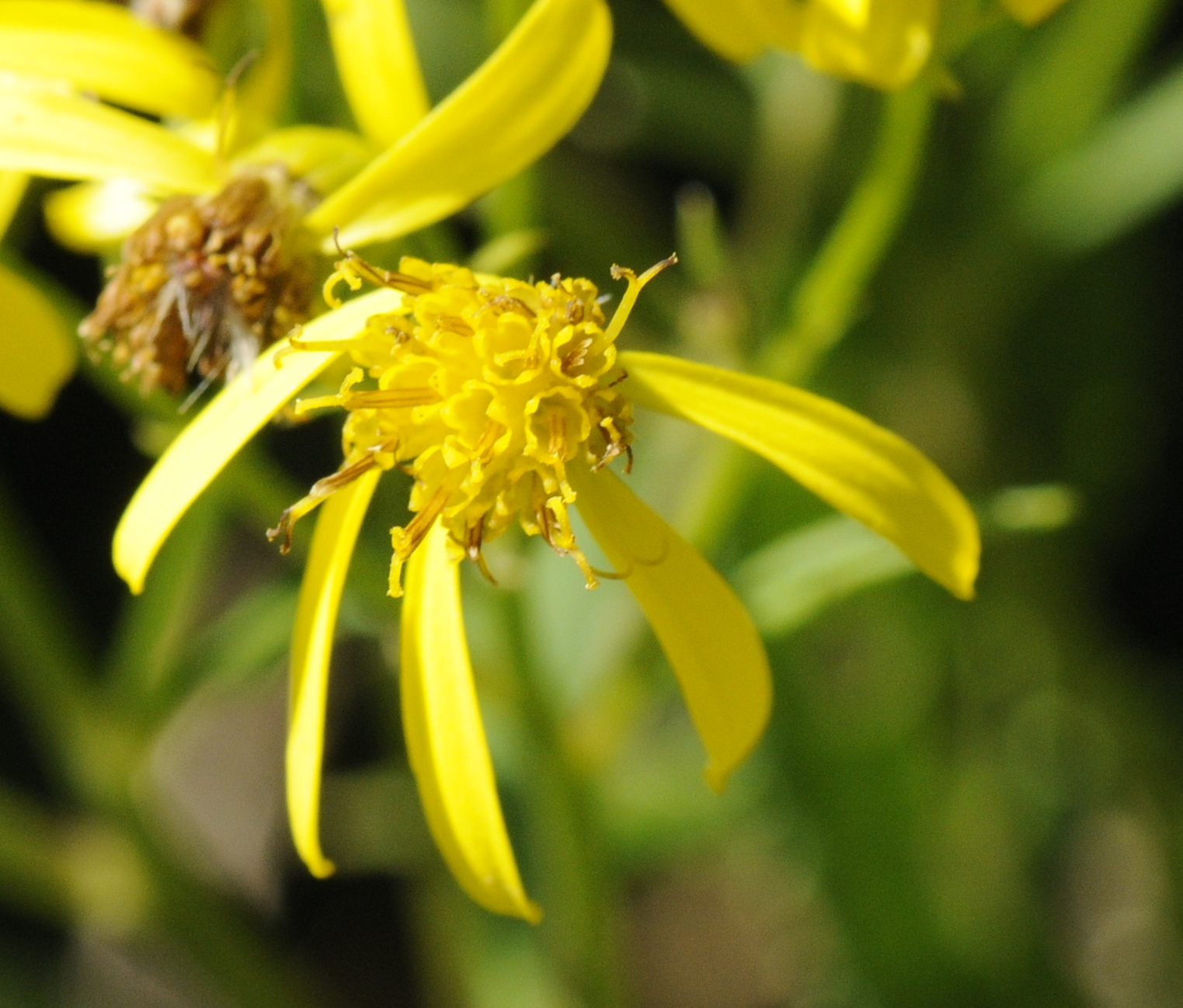
Close-up on a flower
