= LiAZ-6213 =

Russian bus

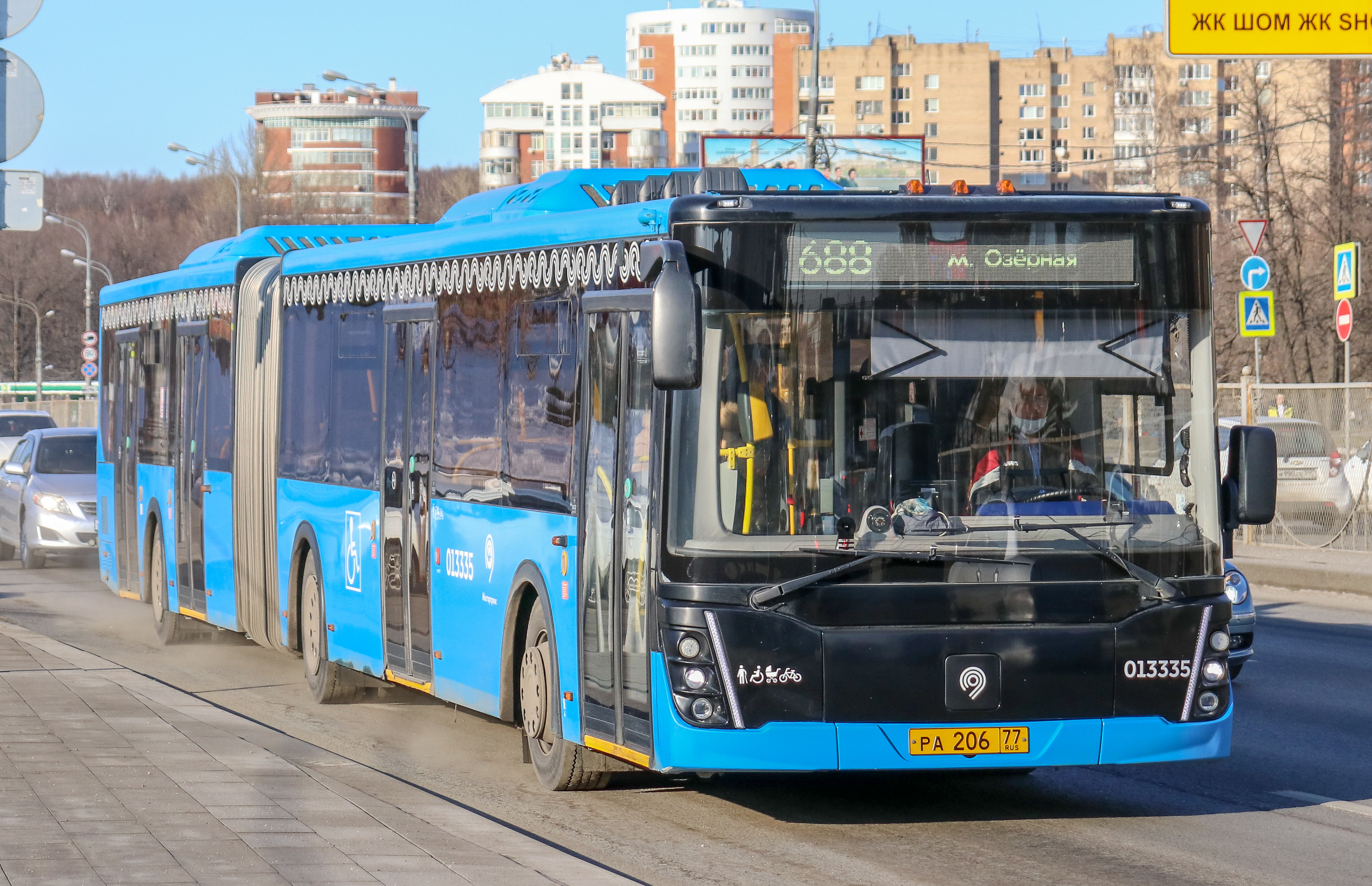

Overview
- Manufacturer: LiAZ
- Production: 2008—2014, 2016 till now
- Assembly: Likino, Russia

Body and chassis
- Class: Articulated bus
- Doors: 4
- Floor type: Low entry

Powertrain
- Engine: ЯМЗ-53613; Caterpillar 3126; Cummins CGe4-280; MAN E0836 LOH01; MAN E0836 LOH02; MAN E0836 LOH55; MAN E0836 LOH64
- Capacity: 154 passengers
- Transmission: Allison T-325R; ZF — 6 HP 504 C ZF — 6 AP 1200 B ZF — 6 AP 1400 B

Dimensions
- Length: 18,040 mm (710.2 in)
- Width: 2,500 mm (98.4 in)
- Height: 2,880 mm (113.4 in)
- Curb weight: 27,000 kg (59,525 lb)

The LiAZ-6213 is an articulated low-floor city bus of especially large capacity produced by the Likinsky bus factory. The first model of this type in Russia, it was designed on the basis of LiAZ-5292 model for large cities with intense passenger traffic. The bus accommodates 201 passenger, 37 of them are seated. Mass production began in 2008, but was interrupted during 2014-2016 to replace imported components no longer available to the assembly plant.

By 2022 over 3 thousand vehicles were manufactured, 70% of the fleet went to Moscow. They also operate in Almaty, Astana, Veliky Novgorod, Mezhdurechensk, Nizhny Novgorod, Novomichursk, Novomoskovsk, Olenegorsk, St. Petersburg, Severodvinsk, Tolyatti and Tyumen. For some time they worked in Vologda and Voronezh.
