= LiAZ-6274 =

Russian bus

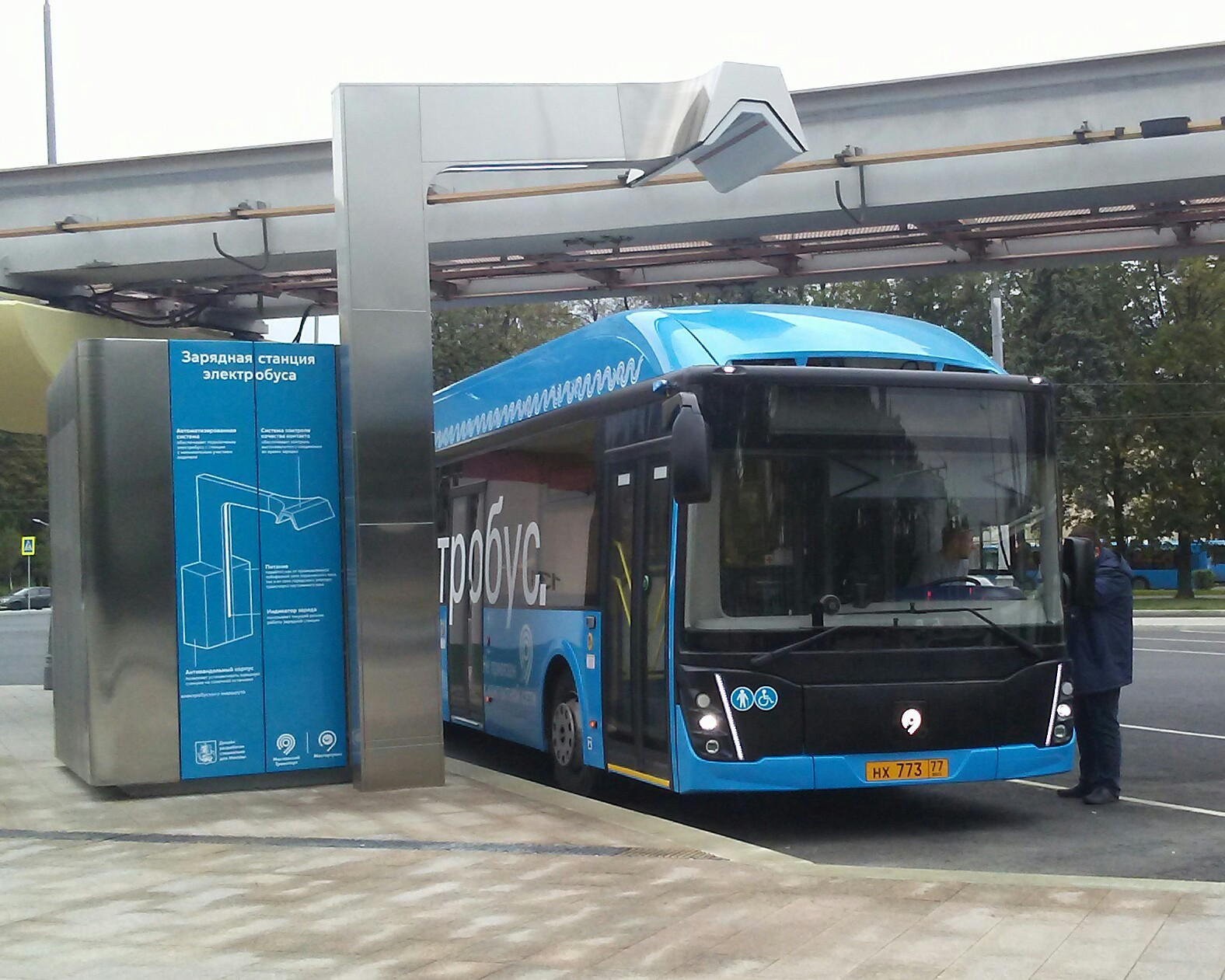
- LiAZ-6274 on charge station in Moscow.

Overview
- Manufacturer: LiAZ
- Production: 2018–present
- Assembly: Likino, Russia

Body and chassis
- Class: Electric bus
- Doors: 3
- Floor type: Low entry

Powertrain
- Engine: ZF AVE13
- Capacity: 110 passengers
- Power output: 180 kW.

Dimensions
- Length: 11,990 mm (472.0 in)
- Width: 2,500 mm (98.4 in)
- Height: 3,140 mm (123.6 in) / 3,300 mm (129.9 in)
- Curb weight: 18,000 kg (39,683 lb)

Chronology
- Predecessor: LiAZ-5292

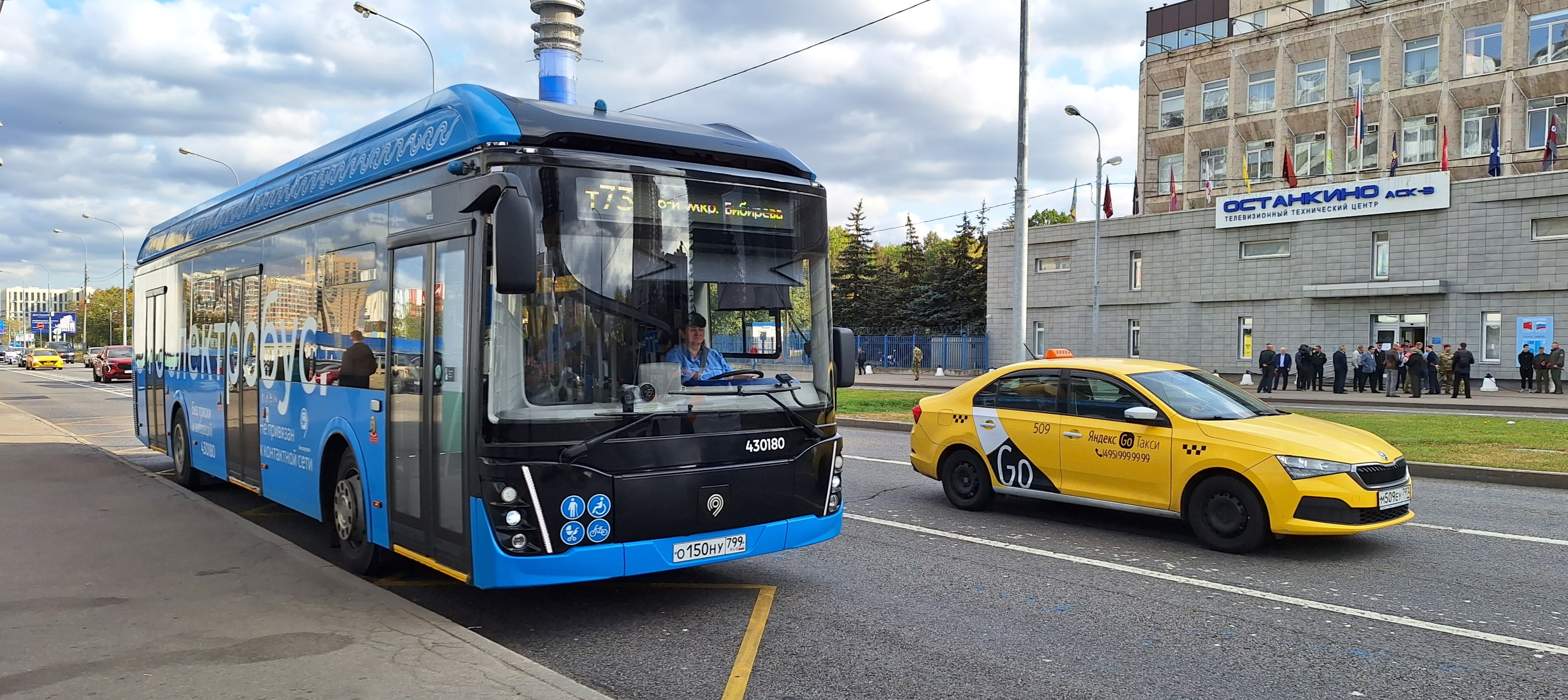
LiAZ-6274 in Ostankino

The LiAZ-6274 is the urban large class low-floor electric bus produced by the LiAZ. The first fully low-floor electric bus produced in Russia. Designed on the basis of the low-floor bus LiAZ-5292 that mass-produced since 2004. Designed for large cities with intensive passenger traffic. Mass production of this model began in September 2018.

== History ==
In 2023, the Likinsky Bus Plant introduced a new modification of the electric bus. The new modification differs from the electric buses of previous deliveries in equipment, the shape of the roof, as well as the location of the rear route indicator: like the KamAZ-6282 electric buses, the rear route indicator is moved higher. Nizhny Novgorod, Yaroslavl and Krasnoyarsk became the first recipients of new generation electric buses. In 2023, the city of Moscow ordered 200 electric buses.
