= LiAZ-5256 =

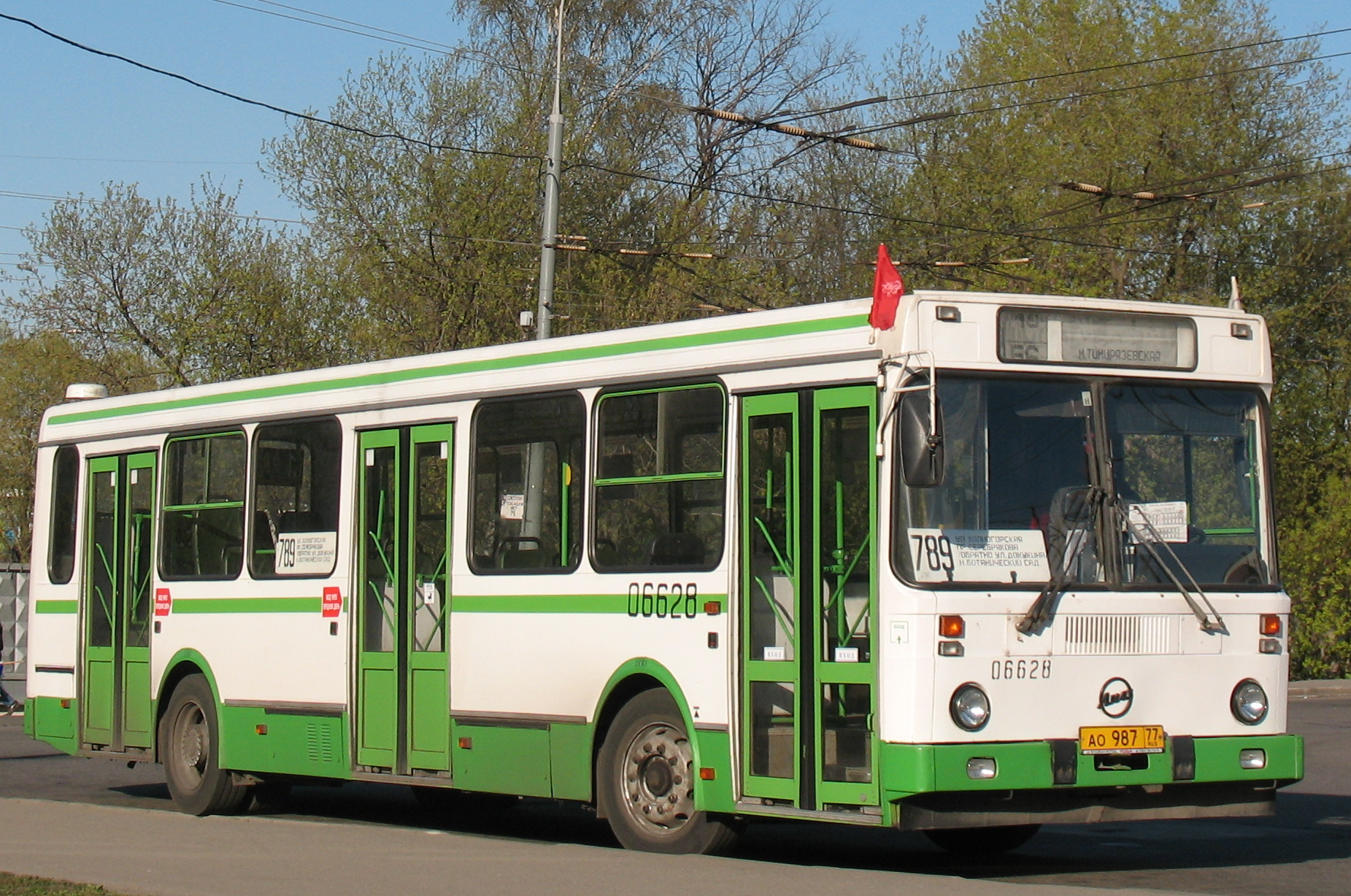
- Pre-facelift LiAZ-5256 in Moscow

Overview
- Manufacturer: (Soviet Union) → (Russia) / (Russia) LiAZ
- Also called: KamAZ-5256; YaAZ-5267; KhARZ-5259 Kharkivianyn; Tur A185
- Production: 1986-2021
- Assembly: (Soviet Union) Likino-Dulyovo, USSR (LiAZ, 86-91) / Likino-Dulyovo, Russia (LiAZ, 91-21); Naberezhnye Chelny, Russia (KamAZ, 93); Yakhroma, Russia (YaAZ, 95-96); Tosno, Russia (ToAZ, 95-98); Volzhsky, Russia (Volzhanin, 98); Kharkiv, Ukraine (KhARZ, 95-97); Konotop, Ukraine (Aviakon, 96); Lviv, Ukraine (Ukrautobusprom, 05)
- Designer: VKEIautobusprom

Body and chassis
- Class: Bus
- Body style: Single-deck
- Related: LAZ-4202; LAZ-5252

Powertrain
- Engine: KamAZ-740 (1986-2009); MAN (1994-1996); Caterpillar 3116 (2000-2007); YaMZ-236 (2003-2010); Cummins CGe (2004-2015); Cummins C245 (2005-2006); Caterpillar 3126 (2005-2010); Caterpillar 3126E (2006-2010); Cummins 6 ISBe 245B (2006-2016); Cummins CG e250 30 (2006-2016); YaMZ-6563 (2008-2012); MAN D0836 (2009-2010); YaMZ-5362 (2012-2021); Cummins 6ISBe4 245B (2013-2014); YaMZ-53621 (2018-2020); YaMZ-53624 (2019-2021)

Dimensions
- Wheelbase: 5,470 mm (215.4 in)
- Length: 11,400 mm (448.8 in)
- Width: 2,500 mm (98.4 in)
- Height: 3,007 mm (118.4 in)

Chronology
- Predecessor: LiAZ-677
- Successor: LiAZ-5292

The LiAZ-5256 is a Soviet and Russian bus produced by LiAZ in 1986-2021. LiAZ-5256 is a part of a bus family designed by Ukrainian VKEIautobusprom (now Ukrautobusprom) alongside LAZ-4202 and LAZ-5252.

== History ==
In 1977 Soviet Transport Ministry ordered All-Union Experimental Bus Construction Institute (now Ukrautobusprom) to design the new unified bus models family. The new project designed in 1978 received the 5256 index and the first prototype had a 102-E code. At first the bus supposed to have a portal drive axle but during the assembly it became clear that LiAZ, where the production was intended to start, won't be able to master it, so alongside the first prototype VKEIautobusprom began to assemble unit 103-E that had a Rába drive axle from Hungary. The assembly of both prototypes was finished in 1979, both of them had been equipped with KamAZ-740 engine.

In 1981 VKEIautobusprom assembled several modified 5256 prototypes for testing at NAMI polygon as well as bus routes in Leningrad, Podolsk, Moscow and Toshkent. New units had their engine moved from left to center, they've also received the equally wide folding doors, flat high floor and a three-speed Lvov-3 transmission. In the double seats had been moved to the right side and a driver's cabin has been separated with a wall. The exterior design was simplified and received a new route sign window.

The third series of prototypes had been assembled in Lviv in late 1981, two units had been finished by December. The changes were mostly visual, the buses had been originally used for NAMI research, later one of them worked at bus routes in Moscow and Yakutsk. After the testing KamAZ-7402 engine has installed on it as well as new rear lights and a cabin partition, receiver and battery positions had been rearranged and a double fuel tank had been replaced with a single one. The state testing of an updated version began in 1983, in 1986 it has been tested with a trailer attached.

In 1982 the fourth series of prototypes was made by VKEIautobusprom. Two new units had various minor exterior changes as well as new two-piece doors and headlights placed on bumper. The first unit was sent to Hungarian Autokut institute for strength testing, while the second one underwent tensometric tests at NAMI polygon. During the testing on Moscow's bus routes the second unit had problems with fuel injection, transmission and windshield wipers. Next year another prototype was made. Its body had a strengthened construction and the headlights had returned to their original place. Throught 1983 it partook in polygon testing before being destroyed in crash test in October 1984.

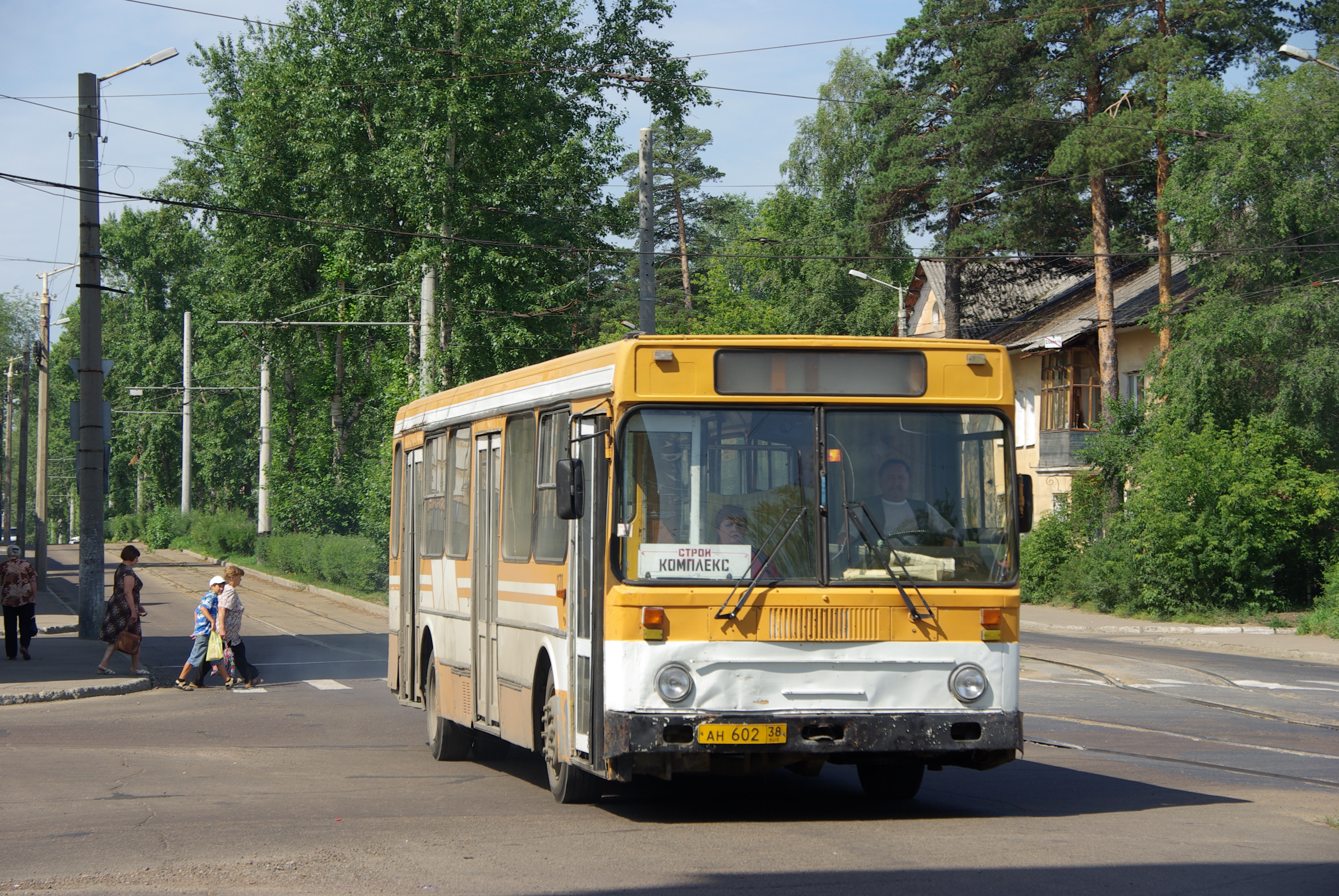
One of LiAZ-5256 early models

The last series of prototypes was assembled in 1984 and consisted of three units. The final design mixed the features of 126-E and 115-E, also it included the new electronics made by LiAZ licensed from Perrod, placed inside the bus instead of underneath, and a noise and heat isolation. Unit 134-E undergone tensometric test in 1984 and units 133-E and 135-E were tested in Moscow. Following the tests the documentation of the last batch has been sent to Likino-Dulyovo, starting the production of the new model alongside its predecessor LiAZ-677.

Originally the buses had been equipped with an automatic gearbox from Lviv but the depots didn't trust the unreliable new technology. In 1991 VKEIautobusprom designed the LiAZ-52565 that had Kamaz manual gearbox and an updated braking system.

Throughout 1989-1992 LiAZ was producing special vehicles based on 5256, including 5917 mobile cinema, 5918 computer center, Mirazh-1 diagnostic center and 5256.05 bus cafe.

In 1991 Moscow Trolleybus Plant (MTrZ) made an experimental LiAZ-5256T trolleybus. Only one was produced. It was written off in 1998.

In 1993 it was planned to assemble the LiAZ-5256 at Kamaz. Kamazautobusprom was created and one unit of Kamaz-5256 was built and passed the certification. The serial assembly had to start in 1994 but was cancelled after 14 April 1993 a major fire occurred at the Kamaz engine factory. The fire lasted for seven days and severely damaged the facility. The disaster harmed not only Kamaz but also the companies it was supplying, including LiAZ. Following the Kamaz fire LiAZ began to look for new engine suppliers. The production numbers of LiAZ-5256 shortened and the assembly of LiAZ-677 had been transferred to other plants, for 1996-1997 LiAZ even had to shut down the factory completely. Eventually MAN and Caterpillar were chosen as the new engine suppliers.

Following the failed attempt of Kamaz Ukraine's KhARZ has bought the project from Ukrautobusprom to assemble the bus in Kharkiv as KhARZ-5259, the parts would be supplied by local manufacturers. The production was meant to begin in 1995 but the factory had ran into financial problems and only around six units were made. Aside from KhARZ one bus had been assembled at Aviakon in Konotop and one at Ukrautobusprom itself, the latter one received an index of Tur A185. Eventually a new family of the buses had been developed in Ukraine based on the project.

In 1994 at Sokolniki Car Repair and Construction Plant (SVaRZ) made an articulated bus based on 5256. The bus received an index of SVaRZ-6240, it never reached the serial production and its single unit worked in Moscow in 1995-2001.

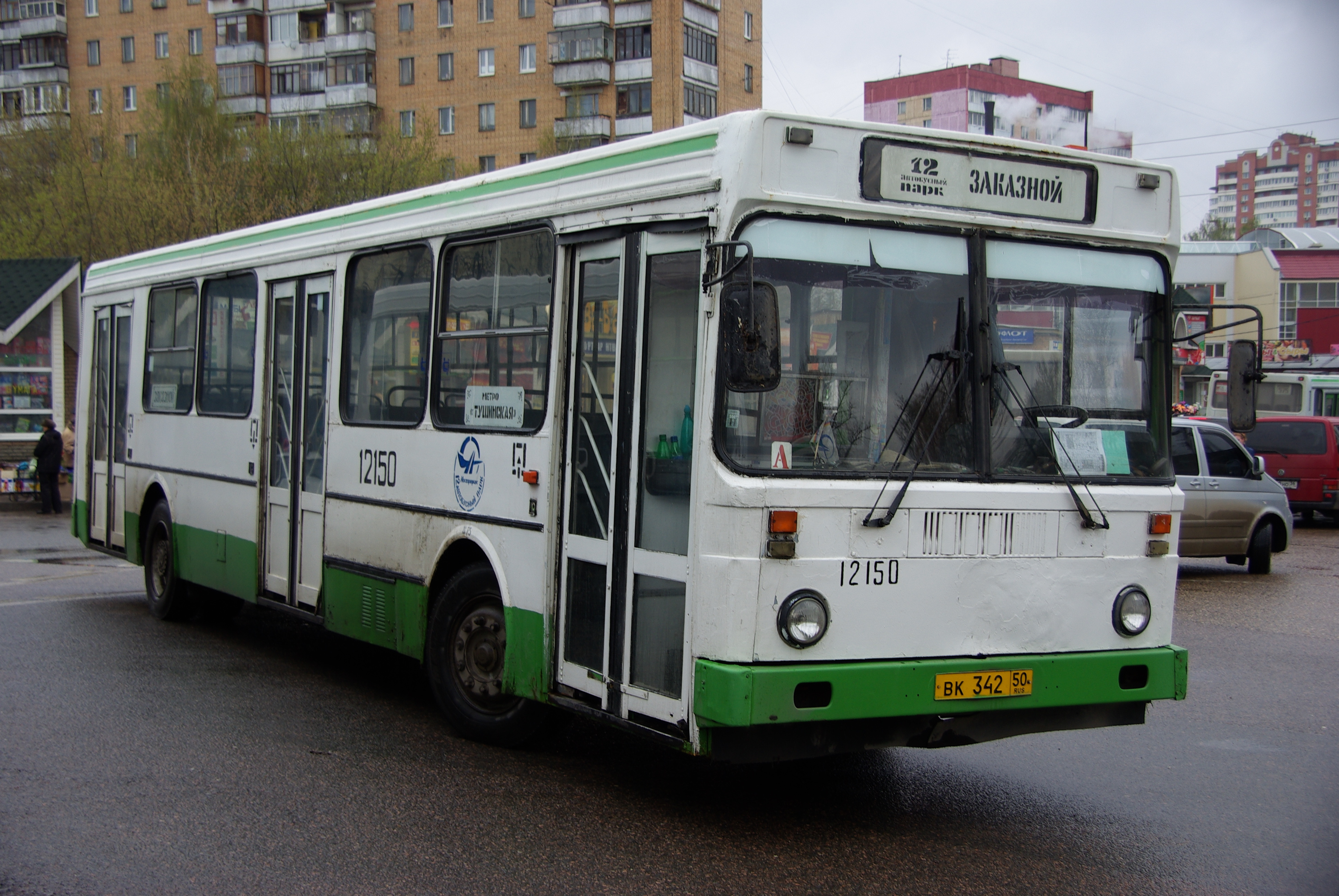
YaAZ-5267 in Moscow

Throughout 1995–1996 a cheaper version of the bus has been assembled in Yakhroma as YaAZ-5267. Due to the consequences of the Kamaz fire a Rába engine was used instead. New engine required to be placed in the middle instead of rear which altered the body design and made the floor higher. The buses could have either LiAZ or YaAZ badges, the assembly quality was lower. Similar buses had been assembled at ToAZ in Tosno under LiAZ brand. In 1996 two articulated YaAZ-6211 buses were assembled, but their service was brief due to poor reliability. The third one had been assembled at Volzhanin (now Volgabus) in Volzhsky in 1998.

In 1998 LiAZ-5256 received a narrower hood to change the rear lights' position.

In 2002 an attempt was made to facelift the model giving it new headlights and plastic moldings but eventually the changes had been reverted. The facelift was done from the second attempt in 2004. The pre-facelift models had been in production alongside the new ones until 2006, a year after LiAZ becoming a part of GAZ Group.

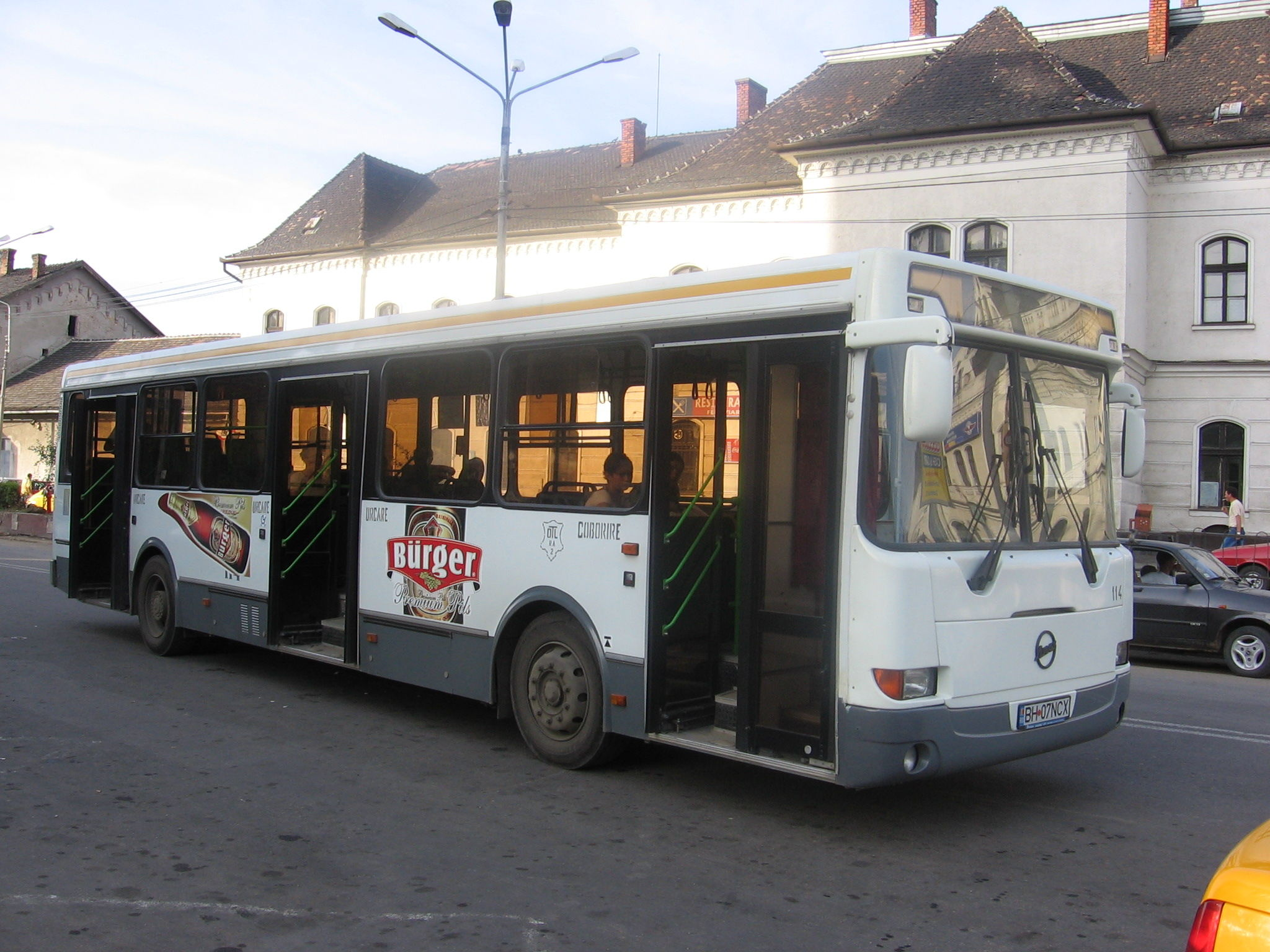
2002 facelift

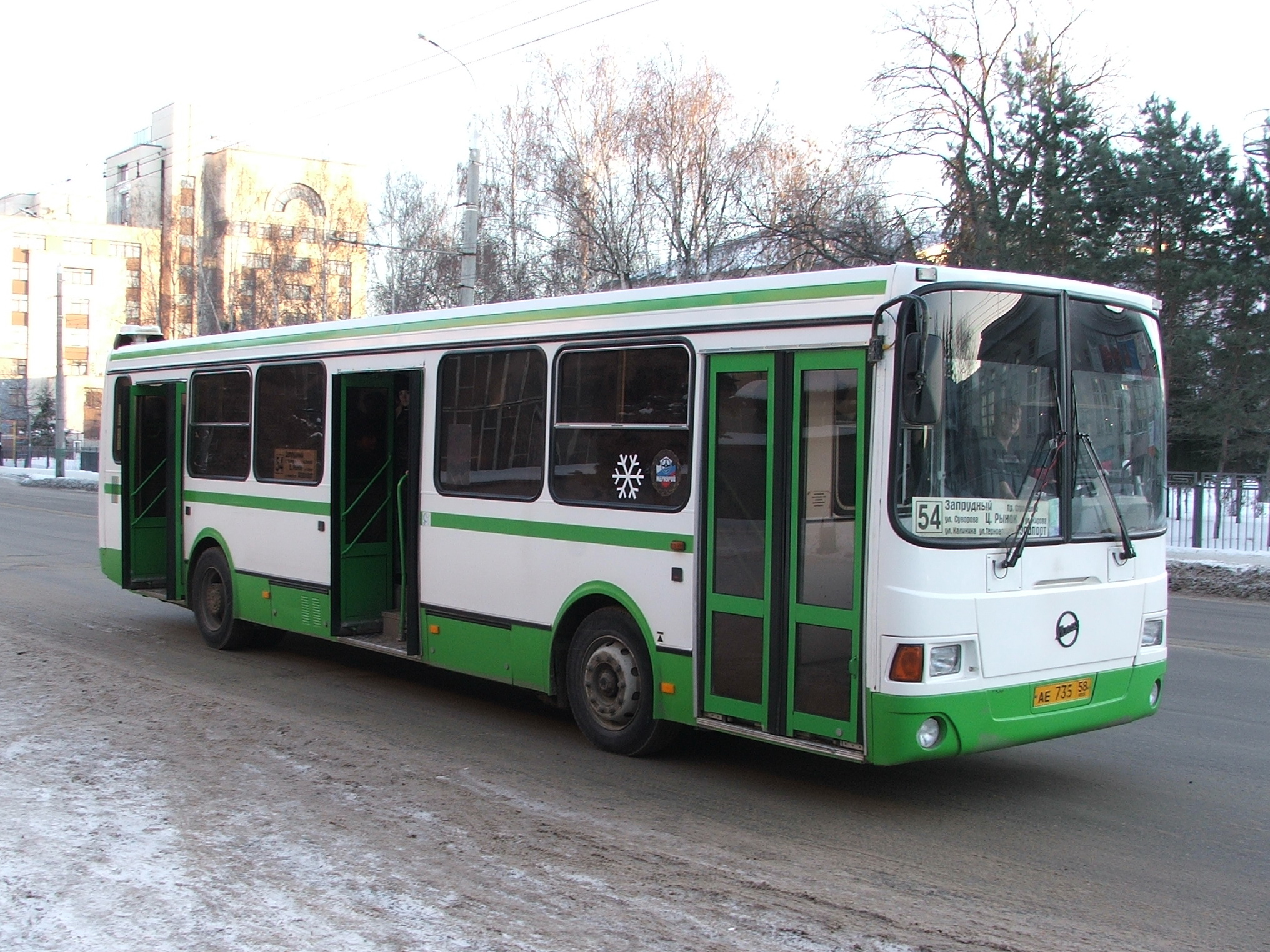
2004 facelift

The third articulated version of 5256 was presented at MIAS-2002, it received an index of LiAZ-6212. Two prototypes shown were still in pre-facelift look, throughout their production in 2004-2014 they were upgraded alongside the base model. In 2007-2008 50 units of LiAZ-6212 were sent to Cuba, the buses had vents on each window and headlights from intercity models. Some vehicles had factory nameplates in Spanish.

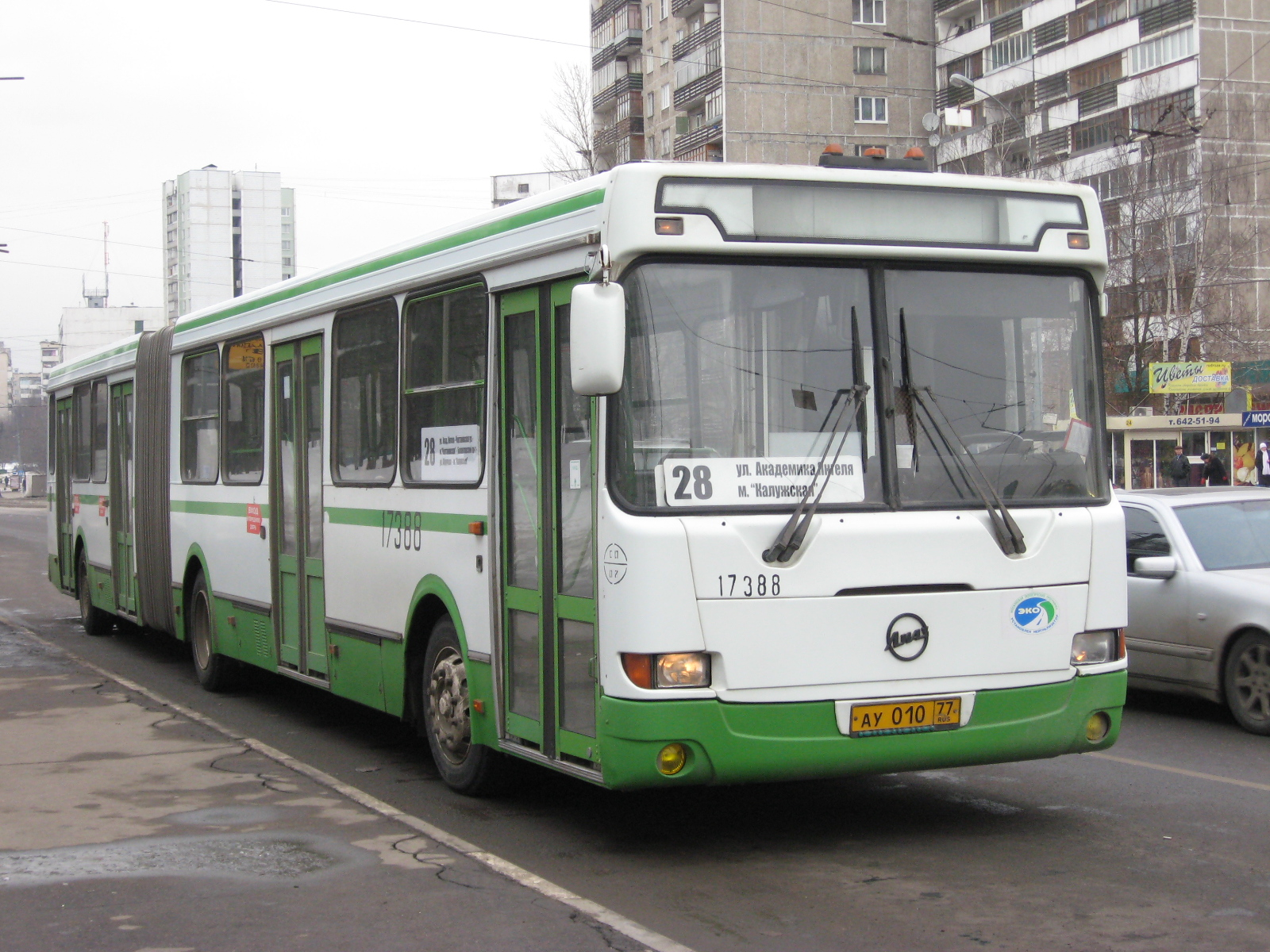
LiAZ-6212 early look

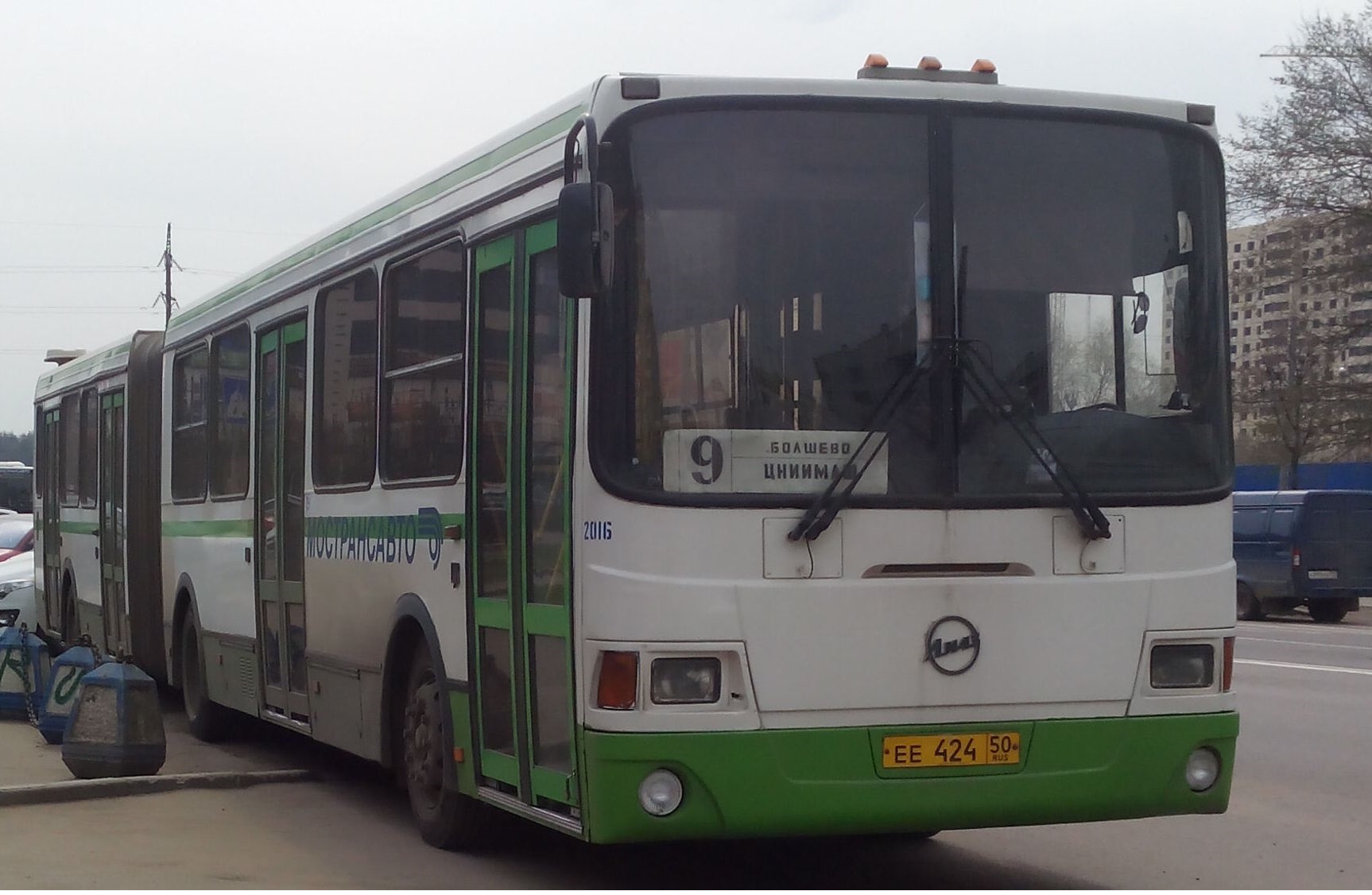
Facelifted LiAZ-6212

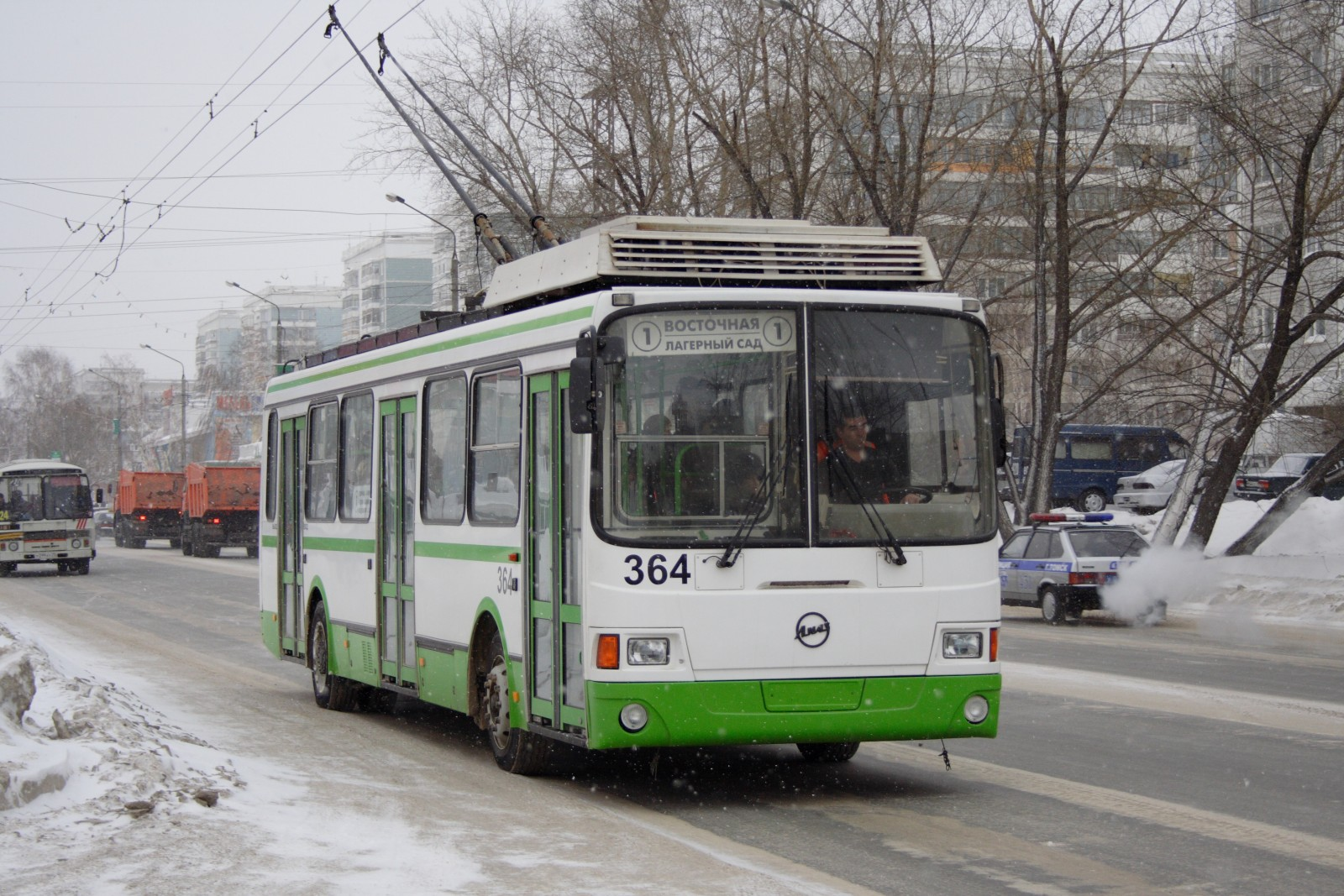
LiAZ-5280 in Tomsk

In 2005 the production of LiAZ-5280 trolleybus began, it was the second attempt of using LiAZ-5256 body for a trolleybus since 1991. 5280 was fully unified with the bus for easier parts replacement, the exception was the reinforced roof for holding the rheostat-contactor control system. The trolleybus could work at temperatures from -40°С to +40°С and 80% humidity at +20°С at 1200m above the sea level. Originally the model has been assembled at Volgograd Transport Machine-Building Plant (VZTM) under the VZTM-5280 designation. In 2006 two units were made at Petrozavodsk Overhaul Workshop (PCKR) as PT-5280.02. In December 2007 LiAZ began the trolleybus assembly at their own plant featuring the full production cycle. In 2010 VZTM went bankrupt due to high tax dept, by the time the plant assembled 185 trolleybuses. LiAZ kept the production until 2012, assembling 78 units. In total, 265 units of trolleybuses had been produced.

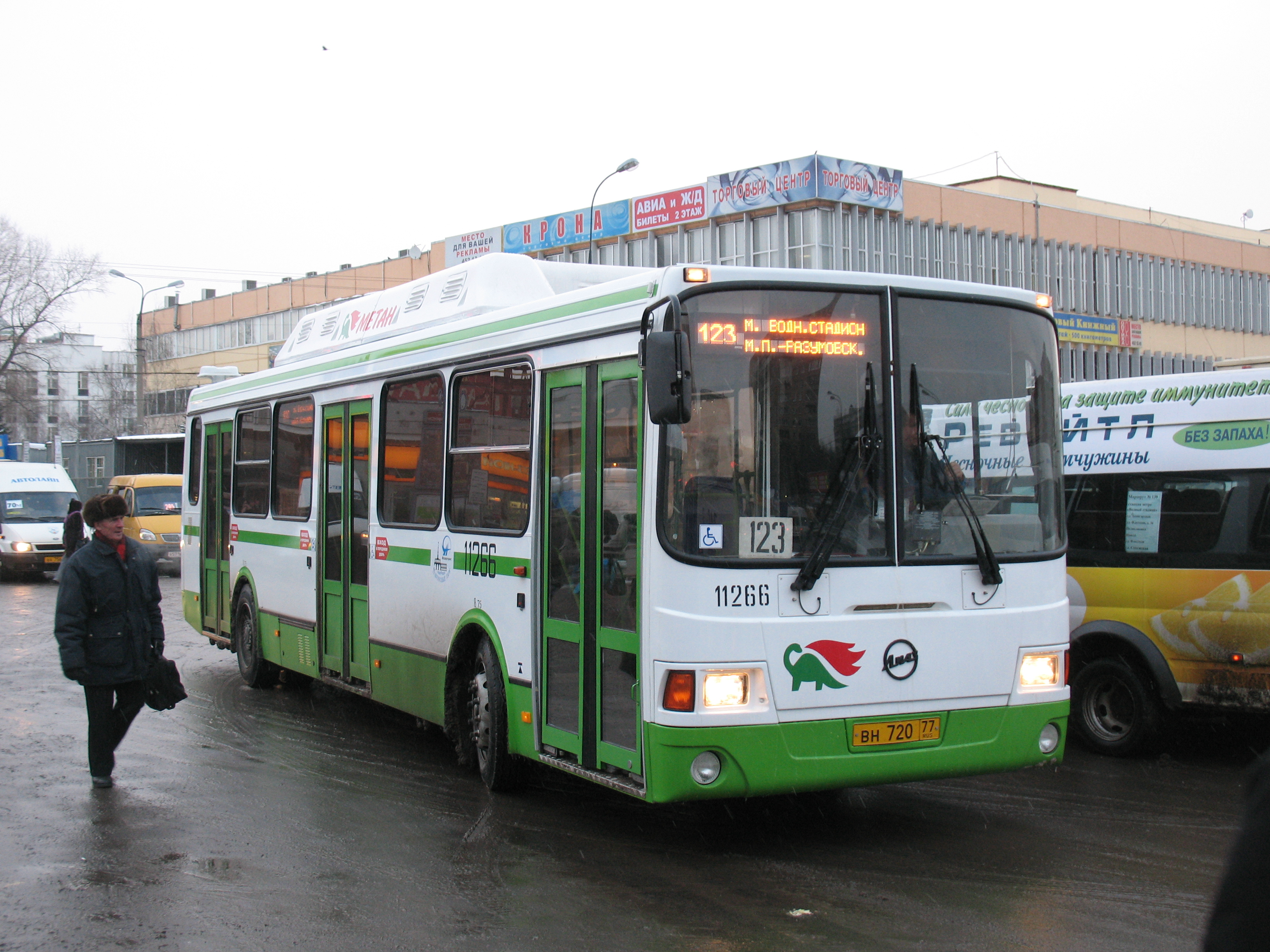
LiAZ-5293.70 in Moscow

The successor model, low-floor model LiAZ-5292, had been introduced in 2002. The same way as its predecessor, LiAZ-5256 remained in production alongside the model that was meant to replace it. In 2006 LiAZ introduced the cheaper low-floor model that had to be 'in-between' the two generations. It was the low-floor version of 5256 that received an index of 5293. The bus was also available with CNG engine. The first ever low-floor bus began to work in Polevskoy, Sverdlovsk Oblast the same year. In 2007 Nizhny Novgorod ordered 100 units of LiAZ-5293.

The CNG-powered versions of the bus was called LiAZ-5293.70 (2006-2016) and LiAZ-5293.67 (2019-2021). 9 May 2013 in Moscow one of LiAZ-5293.70 exploded near the Rechnoy Vokzal metro station. Two people were hurt, some bus parts flew 300 meters away. Following the incident all the buses powered by natural gas stopped their operation in the city. They've remained unused until the Autumn of 2015, when their gas ballons were replaced with better ones and resumed their operation.

In 2010 the windows of the bus began to be glued-in instead of being fixated with rubber. In 2011 the model received the round rear lights.

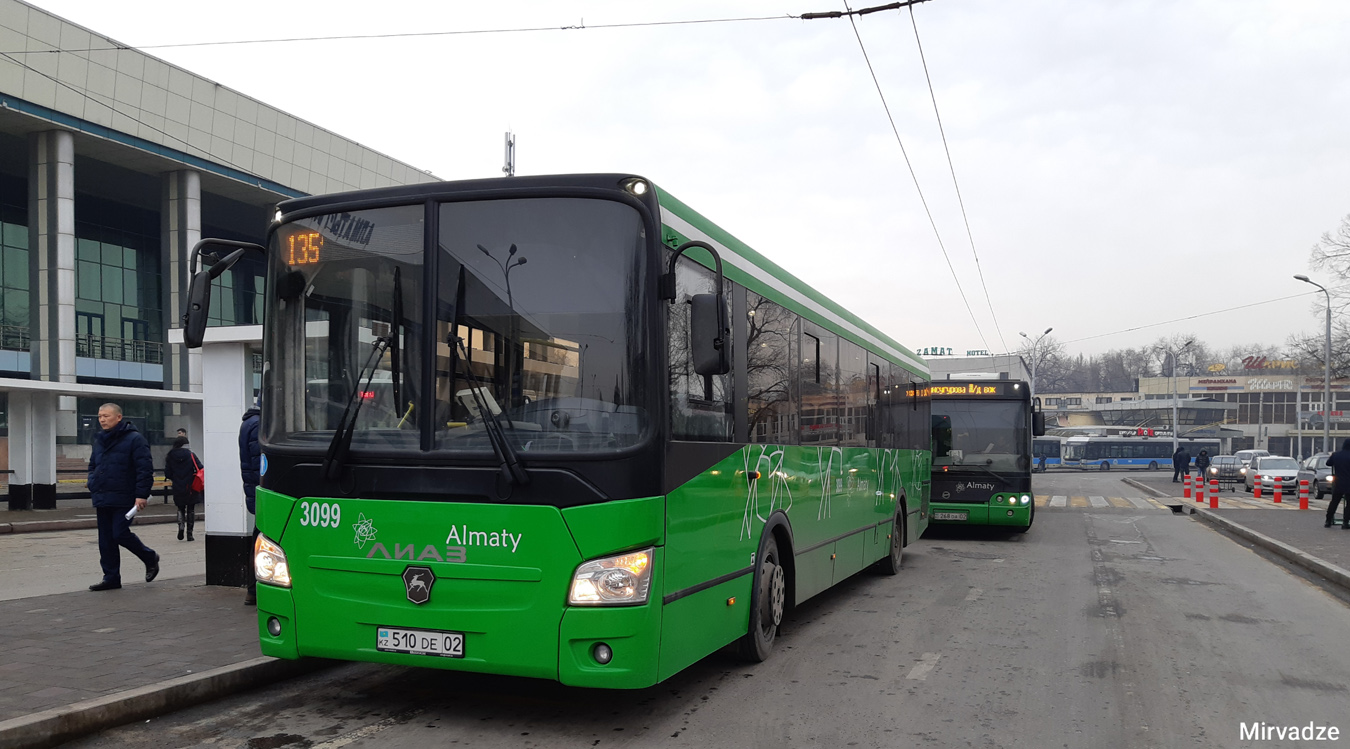
LiAZ-5293.60 in Almaty

In the late 2017 LiAZ-5293 received a facelift to match the main model, LiAZ-5292 (high-floor LiAZ-5256 remained unchanged). New buses had front lights from GAZon NEXT and rear lights from PAZ Vector NEXT. The first batch of the new LiAZ-5293.60, consisting of 125 buses, had been delivered to Almaty, Kazakhstan, in December 2017-January 2018.

Since 2017 the city models of 5256 stopped being offered for domestic market, leaving only the intercity versions. In 2021 GAZ Group that the assembly of 5256 and 5292 would end in April due to the lack of demand. The spare parts production would continue until 2031.

== Modifications ==
- LiAZ-5256
  - LiAZ-52562R – Euro-2 Caterpillar 3116 intercity model (2000-2004)
  - LiAZ-5256.00, 52565 – Kamaz 740. 10 (1986-2002)
  - LiAZ-5256.01, 5917 – mobile cinema (1989-1992)
  - LiAZ-5256.02, 5918 – computer center (1989-1992)
  - LiAZ-5256.03 – KGB staff bus (1989)
  - LiAZ-5256.04 – Kamaz 7408 intercity model (1989-1993)
  - LiAZ-5256.05 – bus cafe (1989-1992)
  - LiAZ-5256.06 – MVD staff bus (1989)
  - LiAZ-5256.07 – Kamaz 740.10 (1989)
  - LiAZ-5256.08 – Kamaz 740.10 (1993-1997)
  - LiAZ-5256.09, 5919 Mirazh-1 – diagnostic center (1989-1992)
  - LiAZ-5256.10 – MAN (1994-1997)
  - LiAZ-5256.13 – Euro-3 MAN D0836 intercity model (2009-2010)
  - LiAZ-5256.23 – Euro-2 Caterpillar 3116 intercity model (2004-2007)
  - LiAZ-5256.23-01 – Euro-2 Caterpillar 3126E intercity model (2006-2010)
  - LiAZ-5256.25 – Euro-2 Caterpillar 3116 (1996-2007)
  - LiAZ-5256.26 – Euro-3 Caterpillar 3126E (2005-2010)
  - LiAZ-5256.26-20 – Euro-3 Caterpillar 3126E school bus (2007-2010)
- LiAZ-6212 – articulated model
  - LiAZ-6212.00 – Euro-3 Caterpillar 3126E (2006-2010)
  - LiAZ-6212.01 – 33 seats model (2004-2008)
  - LiAZ-6212.40 – Kamaz 740.53-290 (2008)
  - LiAZ-6212.54 – Euro-4 Cummins ISLe 310 41 (2014)
  - LiAZ-6212.70 – Euro-5 CNG Cummins CG e250 30 (2004-2013)
- LiAZ-5293 – low-floor model
  - LiAZ-5293.00 – Euro-3 Caterpillar 3126E (2006-2010)
  - LiAZ-5293.53 – Euro-3 Cummins 6ISBe 245B (2010-2012)
  - LiAZ-5293.54 – Euro-4 Cummins 6ISBe4 245B (2013-2014)
  - LiAZ-5293.60 – Euro-4 YaMZ-5362 (2012-2017)
  - LiAZ-5293.65 – Euro-5 YaMZ-53621 or YaMZ-53633 (2018-2020)
  - LiAZ-5293.67 – Euro-5 CNG YaMZ-53624 (2019-2021)
  - LiAZ-5293.70 – Euro-5 CNG Cummins CG e250 30 (2006-2016)
- LiAZ-5256T – trolleybus model (1991)
- LiAZ-5280 – trolleybus model (2005-2012)
- SVaRZ-6240 – articulated model (1994)
- YaAZ-5267 – Rába D10 or Rába D2156 (1995-1996)
- YaAZ-6211 – articulated model (1996-1998)
- KhARZ-5259 Kharkivianyn
  - KhARZ-5259 – Kamaz 740.11 (1995)
  - KhARZ-52591 – MMZ D6112 (1995-1997)
  - KhARZ-52591 – YaMZ-236 (1995-1997)
- Tur A185 (2005)
