= Mezhdurechensk =

Mezhdurechensk (Russian: Междуреченск) is the name of several inhabited localities in Russia.

Urban localities

- Mezhdurechensk, Kemerovo Oblast, a city in Kemerovo Oblast; administratively incorporated as a city under oblast jurisdiction
- Mezhdurechensk, Komi Republic, an urban-type settlement in Udorsky District of the Komi Republic
- Mezhdurechensk, Samara Oblast, an urban-type settlement in Syzransky District of Samara Oblast

Rural localities

- Mezhdurechensk, Ivanovo Oblast, a selo in Teykovsky District of Ivanovo Oblast

== See also ==
- Mezhdurechensky (inhabited locality)
- Mezhdurechye
