= Pavel Makhanovsky =

Russian ice hockey player

- Born: September 2, 1993 (age 31); Mezhdurechensk, Russia
- Height: 6 ft 3 in (191 cm)
- Weight: 214 lb (97 kg; 15 st 4 lb)
- Position: Forward
- Shoots: Left
- VHL team Former teams: HC Yugra; Avangard Omsk; Admiral Vladivostok; Amur Khabarovsk
- Playing career: 2013–present

Pavel Makhanovsky (born September 2, 1993) is a Russian professional ice hockey player. He is currently under contract with HC Yugra of the Supreme Hockey League (VHL).

Makhanovsky made his Kontinental Hockey League (KHL) debut playing with Avangard Omsk during the 2013–14 KHL season.
