= LAZ-4202 =

Bus produced in Lviv, Ukraine (1978–1993)

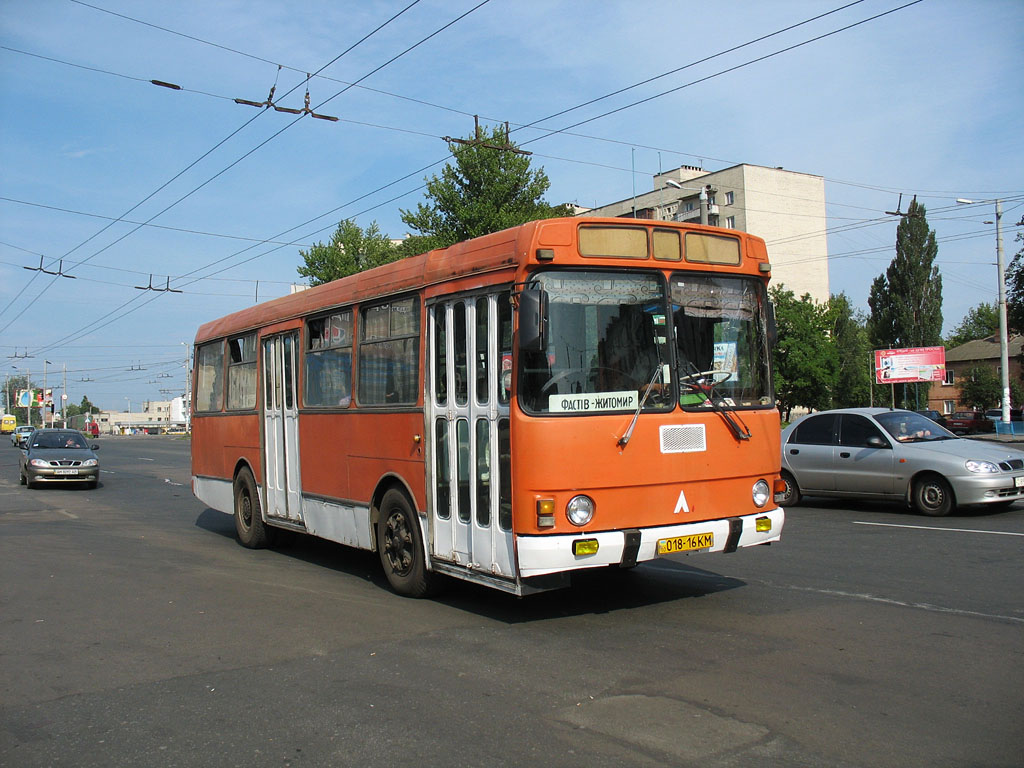
- LAZ-4202 in Fastiv

Overview
- Type: Middle-class Coach, intercity bus
- Manufacturer: (Ukrainian Soviet Socialist Republic) → (Ukraine) LAZ
- Production: 1978-1995
- Assembly: (Ukrainian Soviet Socialist Republic) Lviv, UkSSR (LAZ, 78-91); Lviv, Ukraine (LAZ, 91-93); Konotop, Ukraine (Aviakon, 93-95)
- Designer: VKEIautobusprom

Body and chassis
- Layout: Rear-engine, rear-wheel-drive layout
- Platform: 4x2 chassis
- Related: LiAZ-5256; LAZ-5252

Powertrain
- Engine: 10.86 L Kamaz-7401 V8 (diesel), 180 hp
- Transmission: LAZ-4202: HM-3-80 "Lvov-3", 3-speed hydro-mechanical, automated gearbox; LAZ-42021: 5-speed mechanic gearbox

Dimensions
- Wheelbase: LAZ-4202: 4,370 mm (172.0 in); LAZ-42021: 4,370 mm (172.0 in)
- Length: LAZ-4202: 9,700 mm (381.9 in); LAZ-42021: 9,700 mm (381.9 in)
- Width: LAZ-4202: 2,580 mm (101.6 in); LAZ-42021: 2,500 mm (98.4 in)
- Height: LAZ-4202: 2,960 mm (116.5 in); LAZ-42021: 3,100 mm (122.0 in)
- Curb weight: LAZ-4202: 8,600 kg (18,960 lb); LAZ-42021: 8,850 kg (19,511 lb)

The LAZ-4202 is a middle-class urban and suburban bus. It was serially built from 1978 to 1993, in the Ukrainian city of Lviv. The intention was to develop a cheap and the first serial diesel-powered city bus with serial automatic transmission. Due to initial lack in quality and many teething troubles, it could not replace its predecessor, LAZ-695, which remained in production for a further 15 years, after the discontinuation of the 4202 series.

== History ==
LAZ 4202 was a part of a new Soviet bus generation, which included a middle and a high capacity models, like the LiAZ-5256. The development began in the second half of the 70s, at the All-Union Experimental Bus Construction Institute (now Ukrautobusprom), in the city of Lviv. The goal of the developer team was to bring the first serial diesel-powered city bus with wide entry doors in serial production, which could replace the obsolete LAZ-695. One other requirement was a cheap production, which should be achieved by the usage of parts from other buses and trucks. At that time, a similar LAZ-698 city bus prototype, from the 1960s, already existed. The LAZ-4202 was a further development of it. Also engineers from the Hungarian bus manufacturer Ikarus had contributed to the development of this model. The vehicle tests and the introduction in serial production took a minimum of time and, in November 1978, the first serial buses leave the factory doors. Only 13 units could be built in the first year and 15 in 1980, due to problems in the supply chain of parts from external manufacturers, especially in the supply of diesel engines from Kamaz. Between 1980 and 1982, the production was entirely stopped.

== Modifications ==
=== LAZ-4202 (1978-1985) ===
External images
- LAZ-4202
- LAZ-4202 First prototype
- LAZ-4202 Front view
- LAZ-4202 Rear view
- Gas-powered LAZ-4202 from rear

An interesting design feature of the LAZ-4202 is the position of the rear door in the middle of the chassis. This constructive solution was a consequence of the huge engine and transmission, positioned in the back of the bus. However, it led to an increase of the middle platform. The ventilation of the interior was carried out by opened lateral windows and the heating by an autonomous heater and the engine cooling system. The power steering was taken over from Ural-375 and the front axle, including brakes and steering link, from LiAZ-677. A modern spring-air suspension system allowed to adjust the floor level. The floor was made of 12 mm thick bakerelized plywood. Between the body frame and the plywood floor was a 6 mm thick noise-absorbing rubber layer. The all-metal body was made of large-sized, closed profiles of the types PS-232 and PS-233, which were connected by arc welding. Experiments shown that, thanks to the wide doors, downtime at bus stops was reduced by an average of 50 percent in comparison to older LAZ buses.

The automated hydro-mechanical transmission HM-3-80 was poorly matched to the newly throttled version of the diesel engine from Kamaz-5320. The powerful engine led to the destruction of several transmission parts, thus the bus needed technical service every two weeks. One other negative point of the truck engine was a high fuel consumption in the cold season. In 1982 it received a new, hydro-mechanical 3-speed gearbox, that reduced fuel consumption by 5 percent. The short trials also did not point out the weakness of the body-frame construction. It loosened and fell apart after 1–2 years. The electrical wiring was weak and often tended to burn out. The desired part unification level was not reached. Only 57 percent of all parts were used from other vehicles. Compare to it, the LAZ-695N reached a level of 95 percent.

The LAZ-4202 was discontinued after 7 years of modest production, in 1985, when it was fully replaced by a suburban version, the LAZ-42021. None of the 1542 produced units has survived to our days.

==== Gas-powered LAZ-4202 (1984) ====
1984, in cooperation with NAMI, the Soviet most important automotive research institute, and All-Union Experimental Bus Construction Institute (now Ukrautobusprom) created a gas-powered LAZ-4202. The gas system was imported from the Italian manufacturer B&B Engineering. Nevertheless, the diesel engine could not be calibrated for the Italian gas system.

=== LAZ-42021 (1985-1993) ===
External images
- LAZ-4202
- The first LAZ-42021 on a presentation, in Moscow
- LAZ-42021 in modern days
- LAZ-42021 in modern days, rear view
- A self made intercity modification of a LAZ-42021
- Another self made intercity modification of a LAZ-42021
- A suburban model prototype of the LAZ-42021
- An intercity model prototype of the LAZ-42021
- LAZ-420212

The LAZ-42021 was a modernized successor of the LAZ-4202, designated for the usage in suburban areas. For this purpose, the clearance was increased by 60 mm. It was presented to the public in 1984. A distinctive feature of the LAZ-42021 is a bigger rear engine hood and rear driving lights. The seat number was increased to 35 and therefore, the total capacity had been reduced to 82 passengers. Instead of a hydro-mechanic transmission, it got a mechanic 5-step gearbox. Furthermore, the body-frame construction was reinforced and the lifespan increased from 2–3 years up to 10–12. The electrical wiring was also revised. With a mechanical gear box and an engine, intended to be installed on trucks, the bus was more suitable for intercity trips, so in the 90s many operators begun to reequipped their buses for this purpose. In 1993, after a huge fire at the KamAZ engine plant, all modifications of the 4202 series were fully discontinued from production. In the 90s, the LAZ-42021 series was replaced by LAZ-4206, LAZ-4207 and LAZ-5252. In total, there were produced over 9000 LAZ-42021 buses. In rural regions of post-soviet countries, there are still some LAZ-42021 in use.

==== LAZ-420212 (1993-1995) ====
LAZ-420212 was built on chassis, designated for the export to Cuba, where the local manufacturer, Giron, would install its own bodies. But the Cuban manufacturer did not buy the whole party, so the chassis were sold to an Aviakon aviation repair plant in Konotop, where the production of LAZ-42021, under the designation 420212, continued for further 2 years. LAZ-420212 are recognizable by two smaller, manual opening entry doors.

External images
- LAZ-4204 & 4205
- Side view
- LAZ-4204 Front view
- LAZ-4204 in modern days
- LAZ-4205 in modern days

=== LAZ-4204/4205 (1985) ===
LAZ-4204 was a profoundly overworked modification of the initial LAZ-4202 city bus. LAZ-4205 was an intercity version of LAZ-4204, with two manual opening doors and comfortable seats for long-distance trips. They were both built in 1985. There is no evidence for serial production, nevertheless there are some pictures in the internet, which show these modifications in our days.

=== LAZ-4969 (1984-1993) ===
External images
- LAZ-4969
- The mobile cafeteria on the base of LAZ-42021
- Inner view
- Inner view of LAZ-4969

On the base of the LAZ-42021, a mobile cafeteria modification, the LAZ-4969, was built. It was designated for field service of working teams, like drivers, construction workers and peasants. On the board was a full-fledged kitchen, refrigerator, gas stove, a wash basin, water tanks as well as a lot more useful equipment. In the rear section was even a hall with several tables. There were built about 500 units.

== Technical data ==
	LAZ-4202	LAZ-42021
Years of serial production	1978-1985	1985-1993
Engine data
Engine designation	KAMAZ 740.10, V8	
Bore and stroke [mm*mm]	120*120	
Displacement [l]	10.86	
Compression ratio	17:1	
Max. power [hp]	180 @ 2600 rpm	
Max. torque [Nm]	550 @ 1800 rpm	
Minimum fuel consumption [g/hp]	165 @ 1600 rpm	
Weight [kg]	750	
Engine resource before the first overhaul [km]	500 000	
General data
Maximum speed [km/h]	74	90
Fuel consumption of the whole bus [l/ 100 km @ 40 km/h]	19	17
Fuel tank content [l]	250	
Transmission	HM-3-80 “Lvov-3”, hydro-mechanic, automated, 3-speed	5-speed mechanic gearbox, with an electro-pneumatic shifting system
Capacity	95	82
Seats number	25	35
Suspension	Spring-air suspension	
Steering	Hydraulic power steering from Ural-375	
Brakes	Drum brakes with pneumatic amplifier	
Voltage [V]	24	
Batteries	4 x 6ST-90EMS, 24V, 90 Ah	
