= Mezhdurechye =

Mezhdurechye (Russian: Междуречье) is the name of several rural localities in Russia:

- Mezhdurechye, Biysky District, Altai Krai, a settlement in Verkh-Katunsky Selsoviet of Biysky District in Altai Krai; 52°25′N 85°8′E
- Mezhdurechye, Loktevsky District, Altai Krai, a settlement in Vtorokamensky Selsoviet of Loktevsky District in Altai Krai; 51°6′N 81°46′E
- Mezhdurechye, Chuvash Republic, a selo in Mezhdurechenskoye Rural Settlement of Alatyrsky District in the Chuvash Republic; 54°58′N 46°32′E
- Mezhdurechye, Republic of Crimea, a selo under the administrative jurisdiction of the city of republic significance of Sudak in Republic of Crimea
- Mezhdurechye, Chernyakhovsky District, Kaliningrad Oblast, a settlement in Svobodnensky Rural Okrug of Chernyakhovsky District in Kaliningrad Oblast
- Mezhdurechye, Gusevsky District, Kaliningrad Oblast, a settlement in Kubanovsky Rural Okrug of Gusevsky District in Kaliningrad Oblast
- Mezhdurechye, Ozyorsky District, Kaliningrad Oblast, a settlement in Krasnoyarsky Rural Okrug of Ozyorsky District in Kaliningrad Oblast
- Mezhdurechye, Murmansk Oblast, an inhabited locality in Mezhdurechensky Territorial Okrug of Kolsky District in Murmansk Oblast; 69°2′N 32°57′E
- Mezhdurechye, Pestovsky District, Novgorod Oblast, a village in Bogoslovskoye Settlement of Pestovsky District in Novgorod Oblast
- Mezhdurechye, Volotovsky District, Novgorod Oblast, a village in Volot Settlement of Volotovsky District in Novgorod Oblast
- Mezhdurechye, Novosibirsk Oblast, a settlement in Novosibirsky District of Novosibirsk Oblast; 54°58′N 83°16′E
- Mezhdurechye, Omsk Oblast, a settlement in Mezhdurechensky Rural Okrug of Tarsky District in Omsk Oblast; 56°49′N 74°35′E
- Mezhdurechye, Belyayevsky District, Orenburg Oblast, a selo in Razdolny Selsoviet of Belyayevsky District in Orenburg Oblast
- Mezhdurechye, Tyulgansky District, Orenburg Oblast, a selo in Troitsky Selsoviet of Tyulgansky District in Orenburg Oblast
- Mezhdurechye, Penza Oblast, a selo in Mezhdurechensky Selsoviet of Kamensky District in Penza Oblast
- Mezhdurechye, Primorsky Krai, a selo in Dalnerechensky District of Primorsky Krai
- Mezhdurechye, Saratov Oblast, a selo in Volsky District of Saratov Oblast
- Mezhdurechye, Tver Oblast, a village in Svyatoselskoye Rural Settlement of Ostashkovsky District in Tver Oblast
- Mezhdurechye, Ulyanovsk Oblast, a village in Cheremushkinsky Rural Okrug of Inzensky District in Ulyanovsk Oblast
- Mezhdurechye, Kharovsky District, Vologda Oblast, a village in Azletsky Selsoviet of Kharovsky District in Vologda Oblast
- Mezhdurechye, Vologodsky District, Vologda Oblast, a village in Priluksky Selsoviet of Vologodsky District in Vologda Oblast
- Mezhdurechye, Yaroslavl Oblast, a village in Zayachye-Kholmsky Rural Okrug of Gavrilov-Yamsky District in Yaroslavl Oblast

== Crimea ==
- Mizhrichia, Crimea (Mezhdureche in Russian) a selo under the administrative jurisdiction of Sudak
