= LiAZ-5292 =

Russian-made low-floor city bus

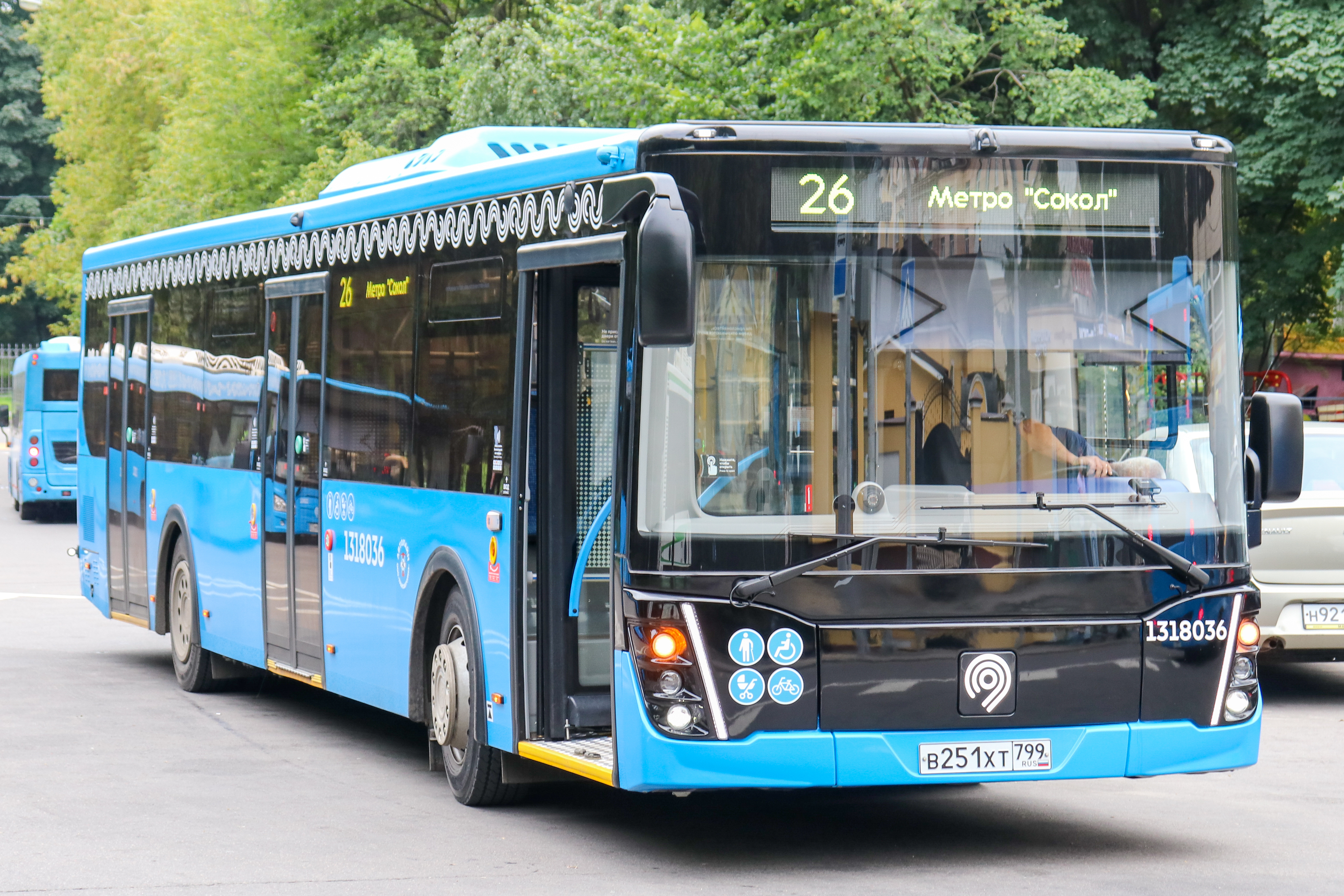
- LiAZ-5292 (styling of 2020)

Overview
- Type: city transit bus or suburban commuter
- Manufacturer: LiAZ
- Production: 2002-present
- Assembly: Likino-Dulyovo, Russia (LiAZ)

Body and chassis
- Class: Mass transit bus
- Doors: 3
- Floor type: Low floor

Powertrain
- Engine: YaMZ-536, Weichai WP7
- Capacity: 114 passengers (28 seated)
- Power output: 276 HP
- Transmission: ZF, Voith or FastGear

Dimensions
- Length: 12410 mm
- Width: 2500 mm
- Height: 2880 mm
- Curb weight: 11050 kg

Chronology
- Predecessor: LiAZ-5256

The LiAZ-5292 is a low-floor bus produced by the bus-manufacturing plant LiAZ in Likino-Dulyovo, Russia, part of the GAZ Group.

== History ==
The predecessor of model 5292 was LiAZ-5256 that was produced since 1986. Newer model was supposed to be the first completely low-floor city bus by LiAZ. It was first delivered by 2002 and appeared more comfortable as well as more expensive than semi-low-floor sibling, LiAZ-5293, but due to the dire economic circumstances in Russia model 5292 did not went into mass production immediately.

In 2005 Moscow municipality has ordered first lots of LiAZ-5292 and until now around 31.5 thousand vehicles have been delivered. Now it is one of the most common type of buses on the streets of large Russian cities such as Moscow and St.Petersburg. The bus was also exported to neighbour countries.

LiAZ-5292 were used by the official carrier during Sochi Winter Olympics 2014.

== Specification ==
The design of the body and exterior much resembles earlier model 5256, however, technically and with regards to interior it is a completely new vehicle.

Initially the bus was powered by Caterpillar 3126E diesel engine coupled with Voith Diwa D 851.3E automatic transmission. Later modifications were fitted with MAN, Scania, Cummins, and YaMZ diesel and LNG engines complying with Euro-3 to Euro-5 requirements, coupled with ZF Ecomat/Ecolife or Voith series gearboxes.

Engine was located in the rear end of the body, and depending on the modification the bus may lack rear window. The bus accommodates 108-114 passengers, 28 of them are seated.

Once the model has proven successful and familiar to the public transport enterprises around the country, their workshops and depots, LiAZ created a variety of modifications, including intercity and suburban commuter, articulated bus for larger cities (marketed as LiAZ-6213), trolleybus and electric bus.

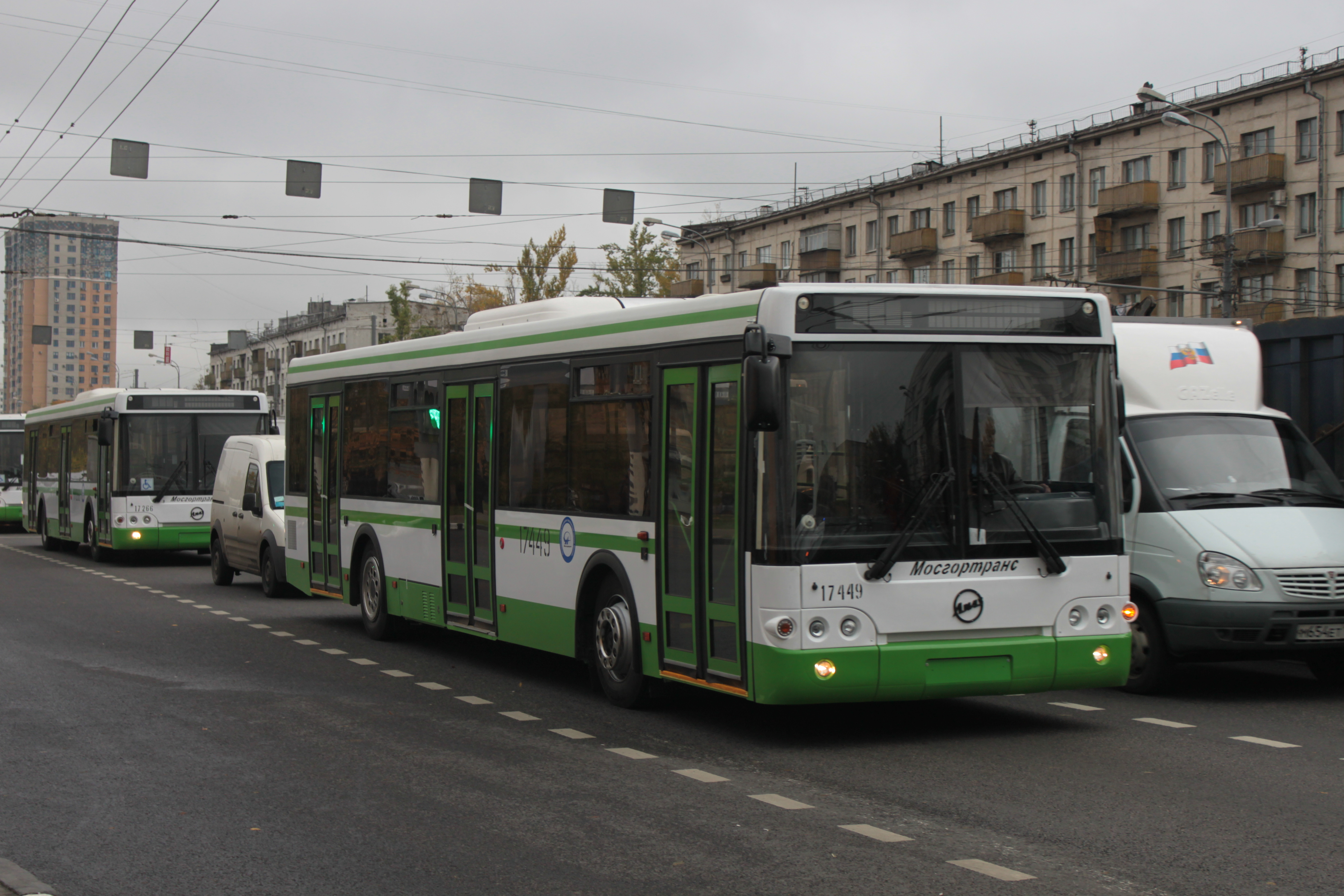
LiAZ-5292 in Moscow, Russia

Since 2022 the bus is fitted with domestic YaMZ and imported Weichai engines, coupled with Shaanxi Fast Gear automatic transmission. The manufacturer's parent company, GAZ is developing a domestic automatic gearbox, that so far (2024) is ready only for smaller size buses of the GAZ Group.
