= LiAZ-677 =

Soviet/Russian bus

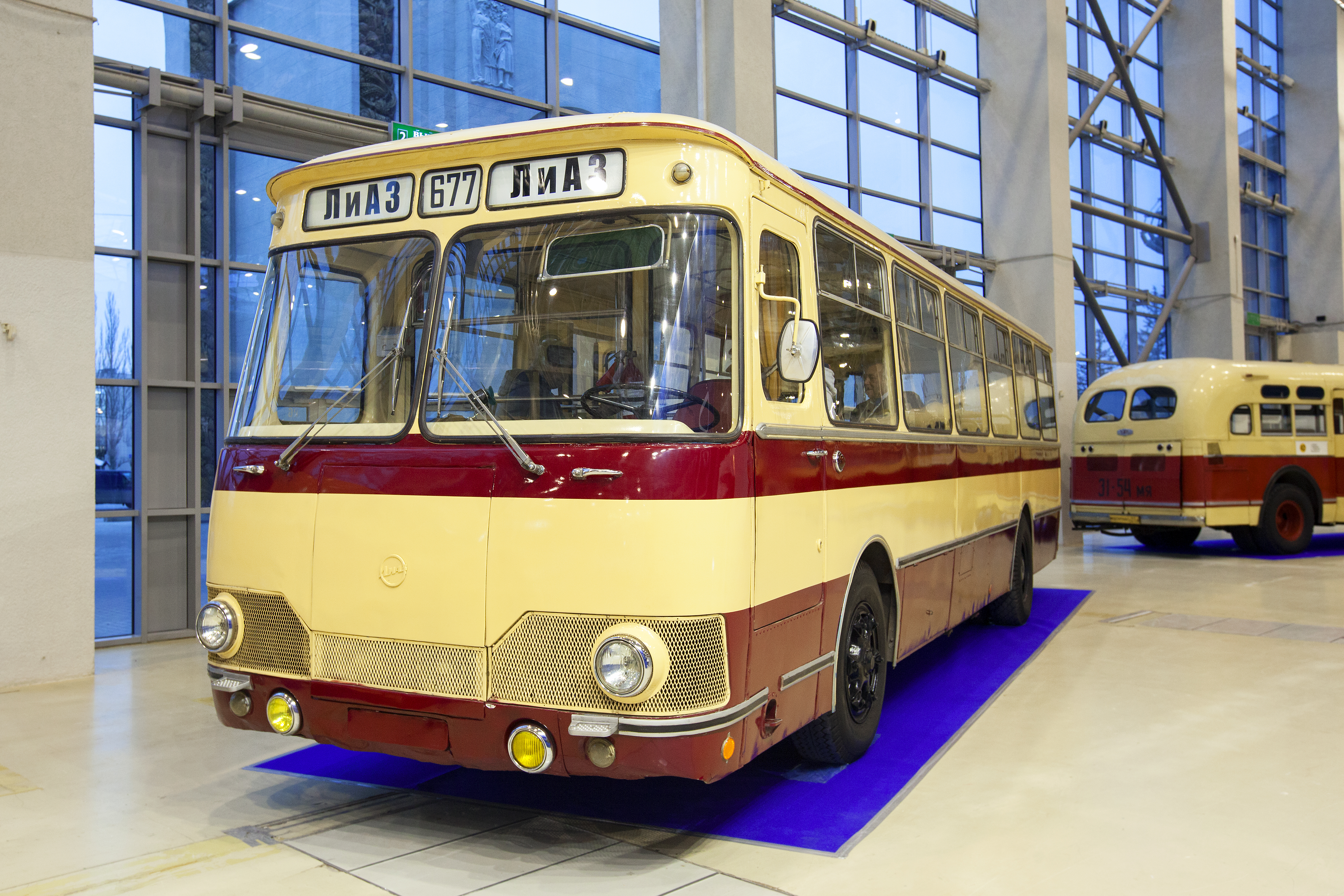
- The original LiAZ-677

Overview
- Manufacturer: (Russian Soviet Federative Socialist Republic) → (Russia) / (Russia) LiAZ
- Production: 1967—2002
- Assembly: (Russian Soviet Federative Socialist Republic) Likino-Dulyovo, RSFSR (LiAZ, 67-91) / Likino-Dulyovo, Russia (LiAZ, 91-94); Yakhroma, Russia (YaAZ, 94-02); Orekhovo-Zuevo, Russia (Remtechmash, 94-02); Rybinsk, Russia (VMZ, 94-02)

Body and chassis
- Class: City bus
- Doors: 2
- Floor type: High entry

Powertrain
- Engine: ЗИЛ-375Я7 and ЗИЛ-509.10
- Capacity: 110 passengers
- Transmission: hydromechanical

Dimensions
- Length: 10,565 mm (415.9 in)
- Width: 2,500 mm (98.4 in)
- Height: 3,033 mm (119.4 in)
- Curb weight: 8,363 kg (18,437 lb)

Chronology
- Successor: LiAZ-5256

The LiAZ-677 is a Soviet and Russian city high-floor bus produced by the Likinsky Bus Plant. The first prototype was released in 1963, and mass-produced from 1967 to 1994. Third-party car kits assembly lasted until 2002. The LiAZ-677 was the most popular model of the plant, and the first Soviet bus with a hydromechanical (automatic) gearbox. This model was used by urban and suburban bus service in almost all cities of the Soviet Union.

== Gallery ==
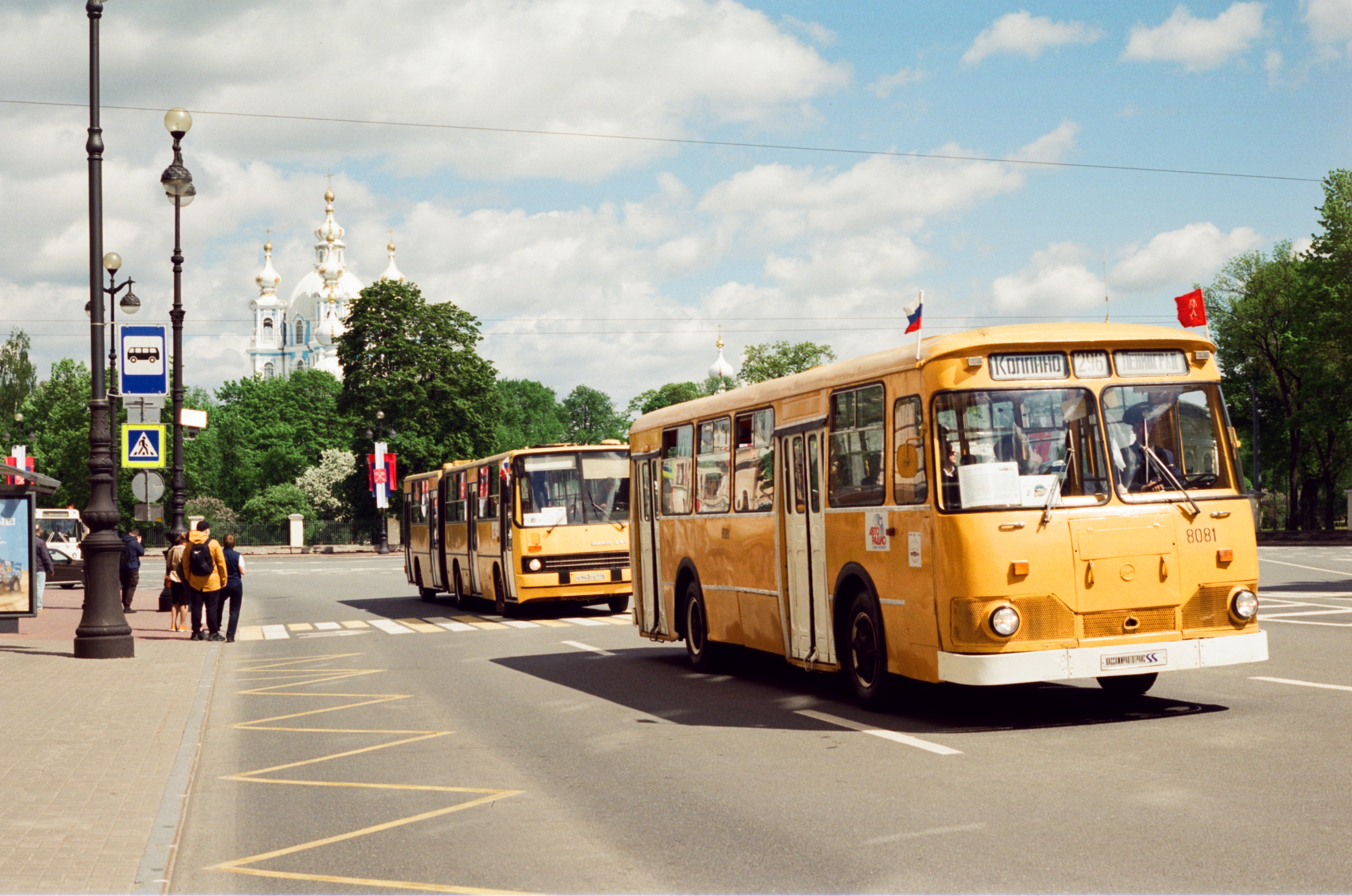

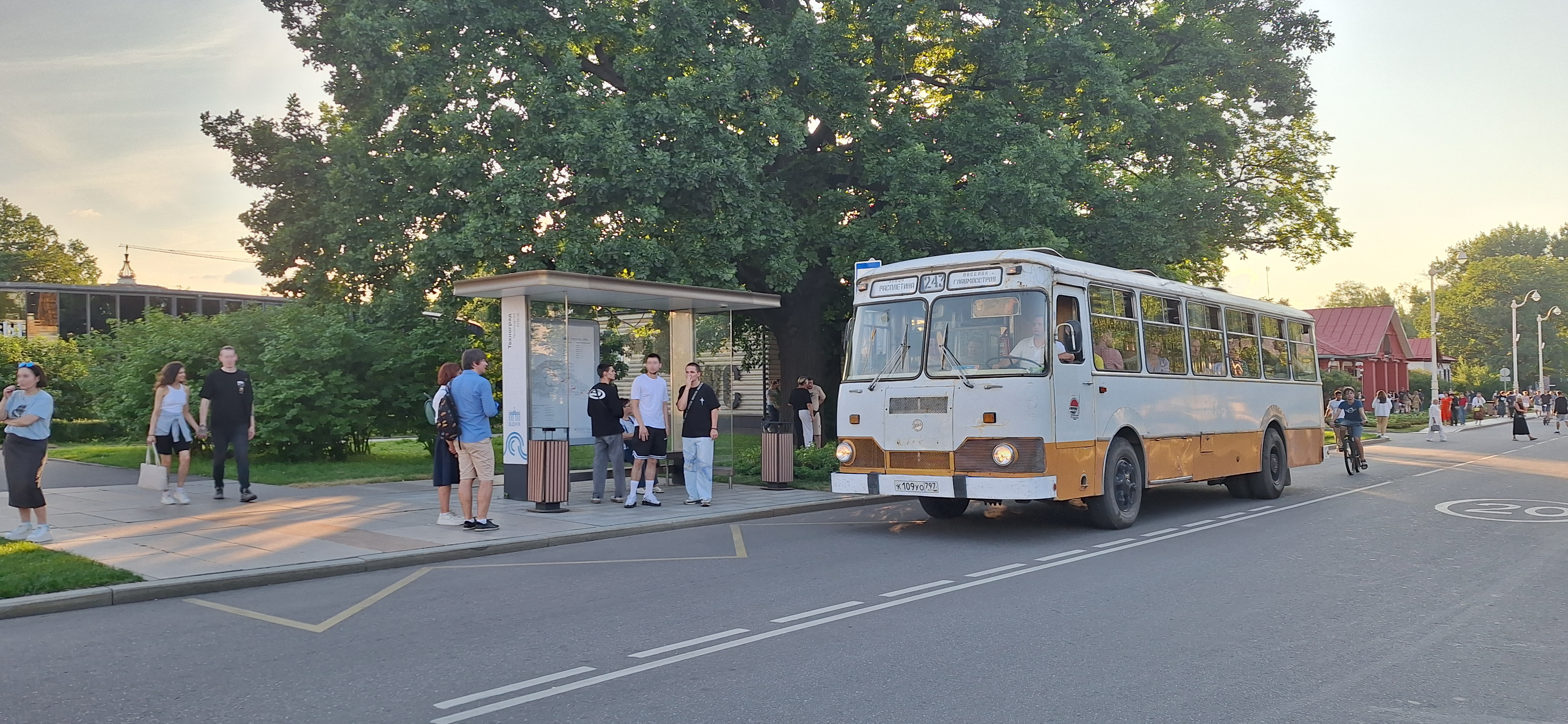

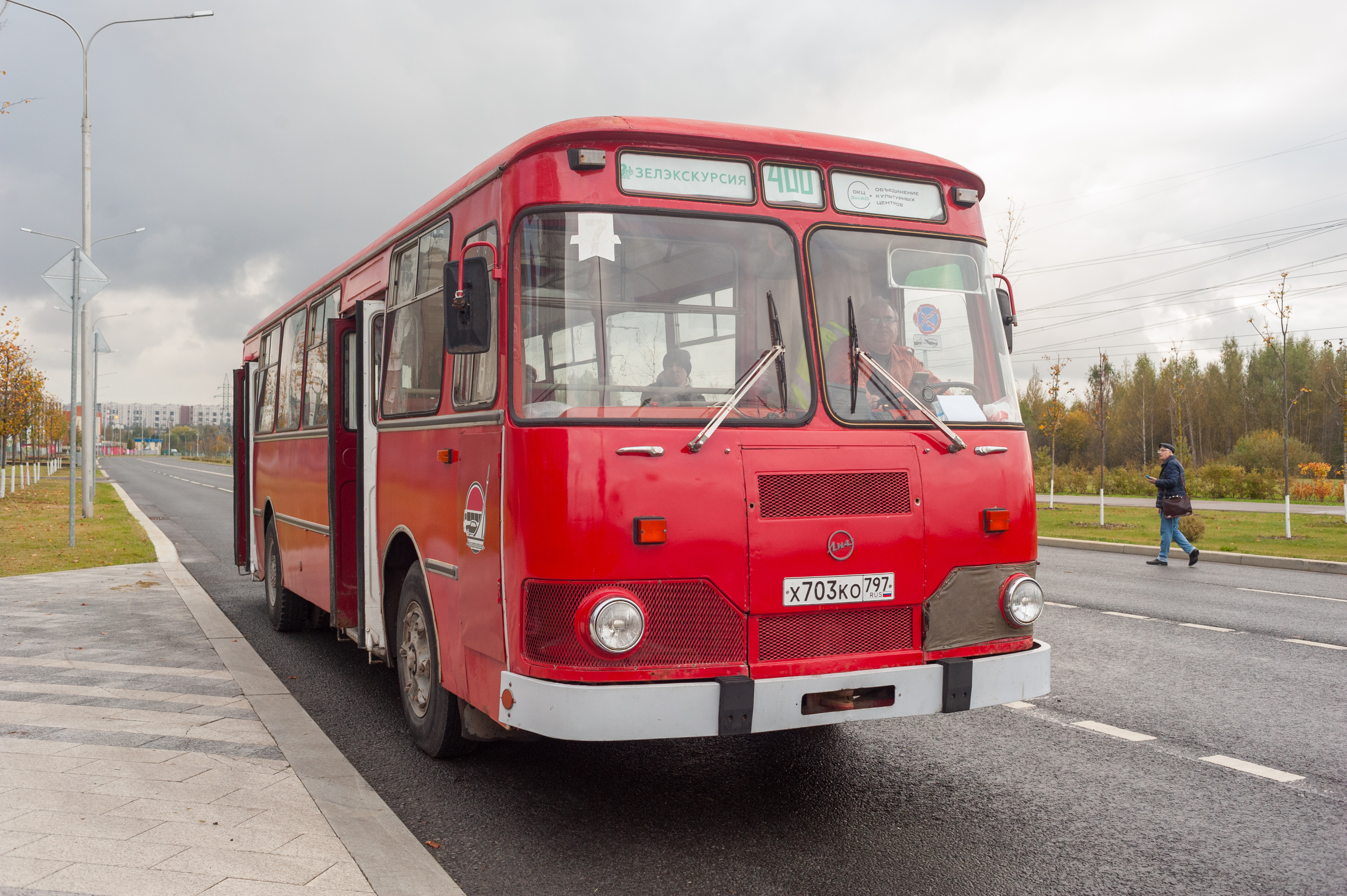

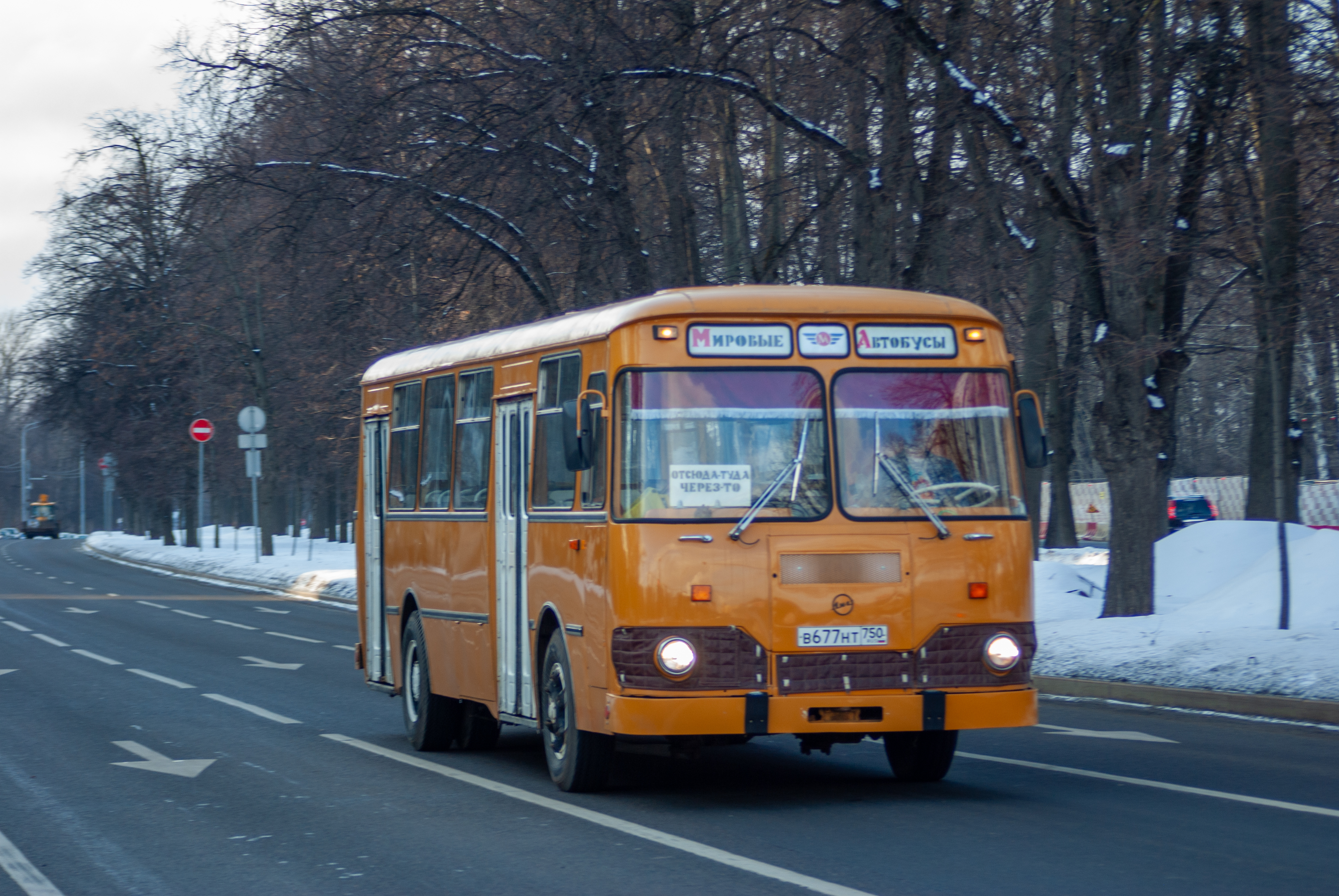

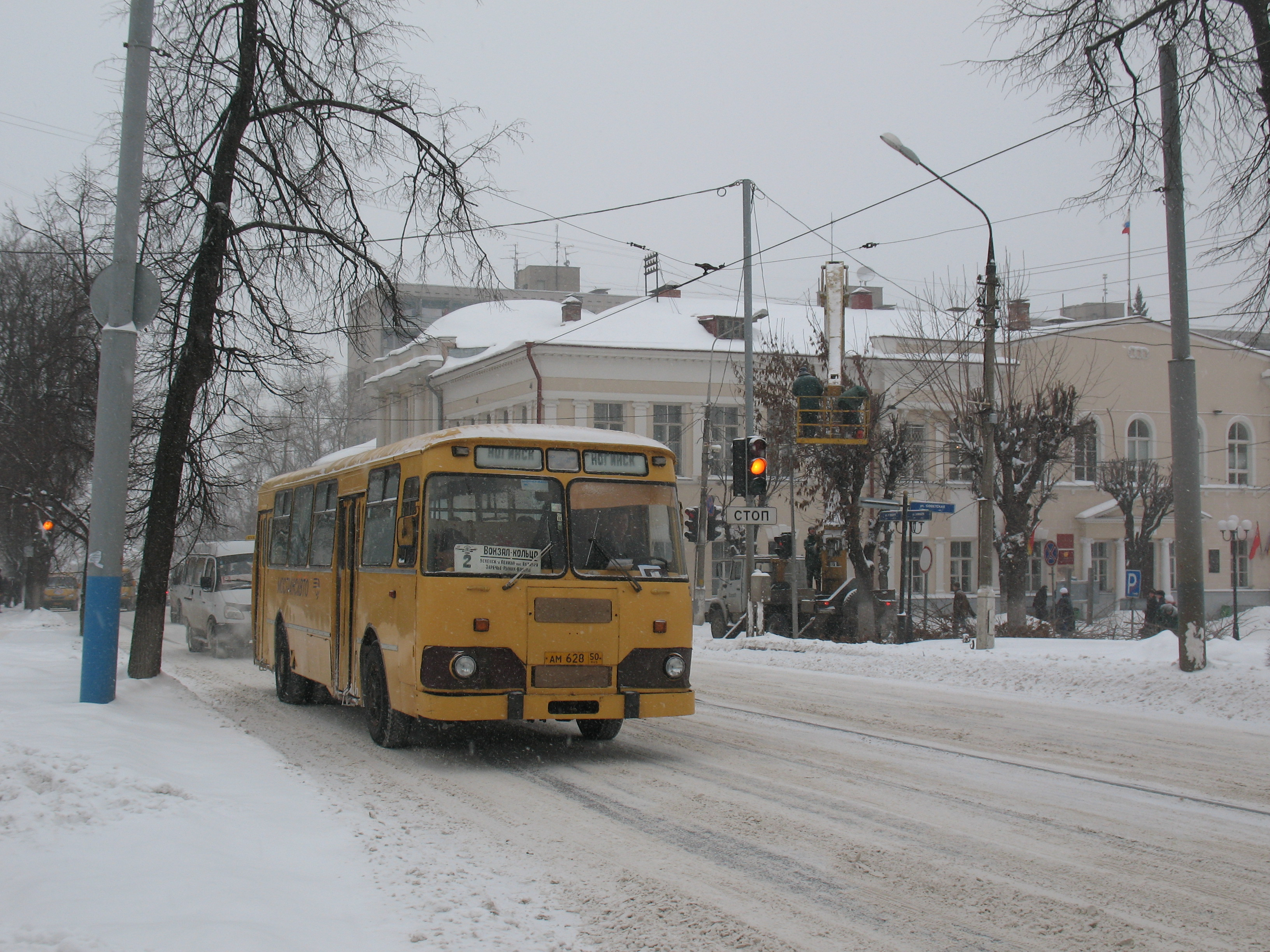

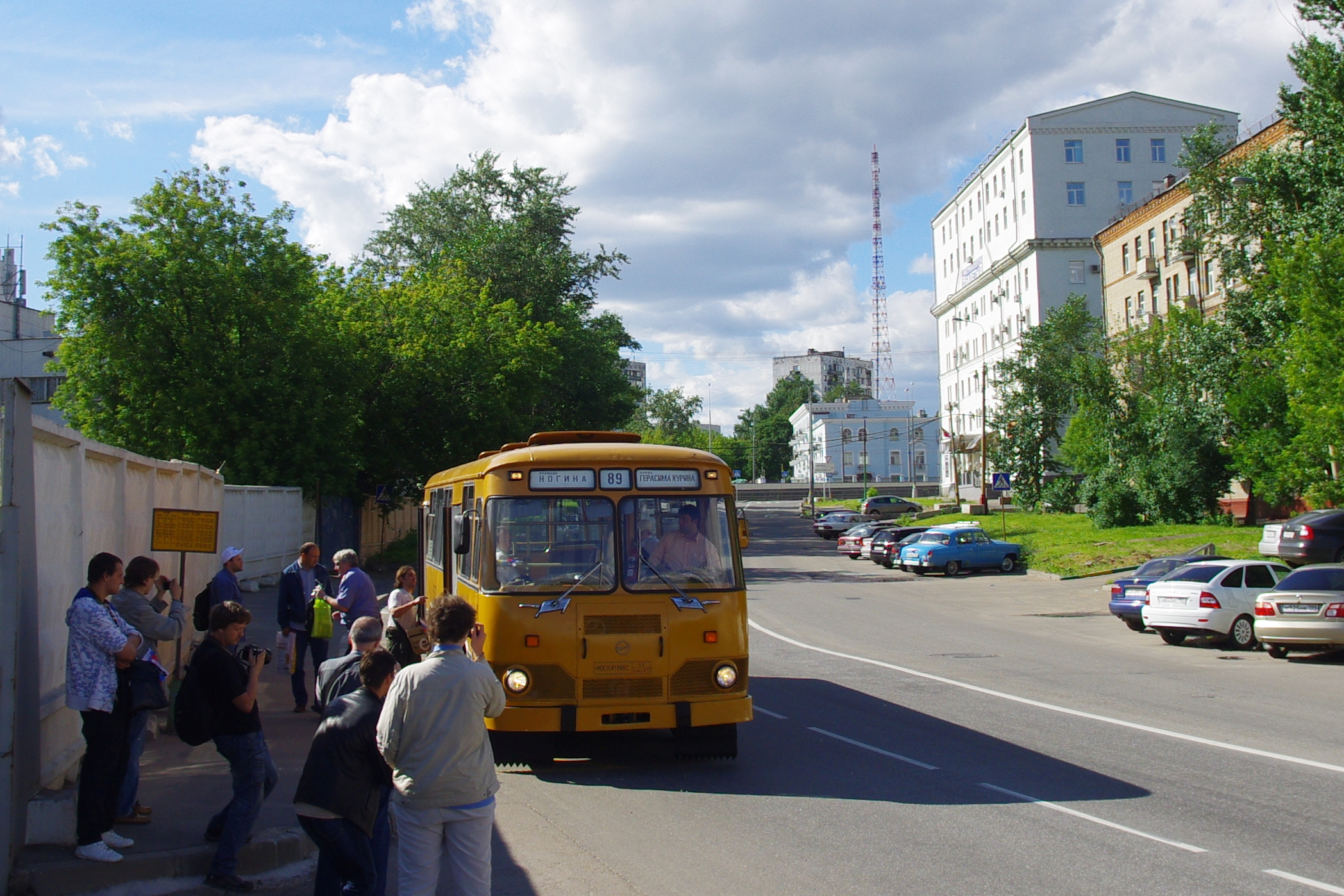

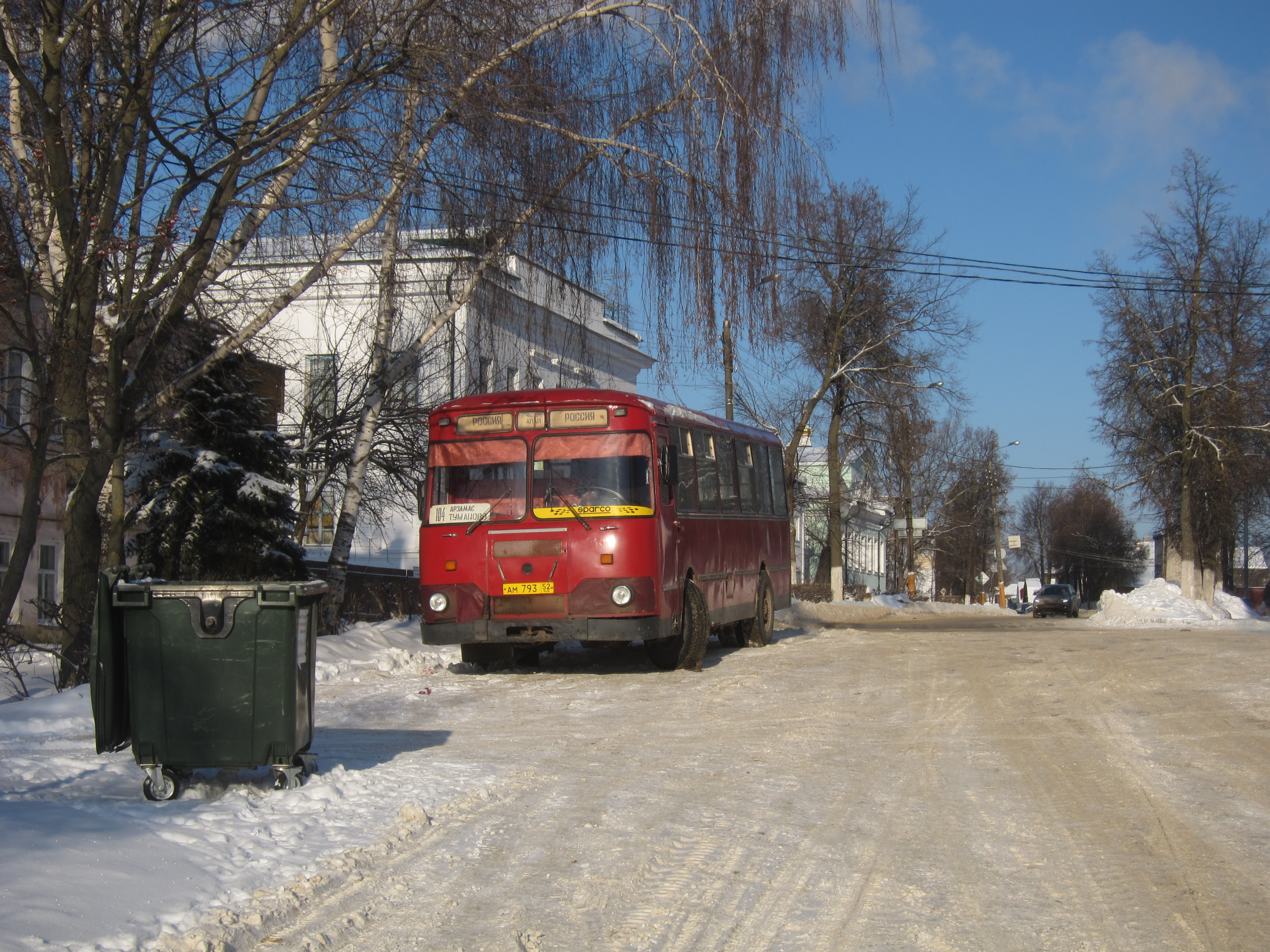

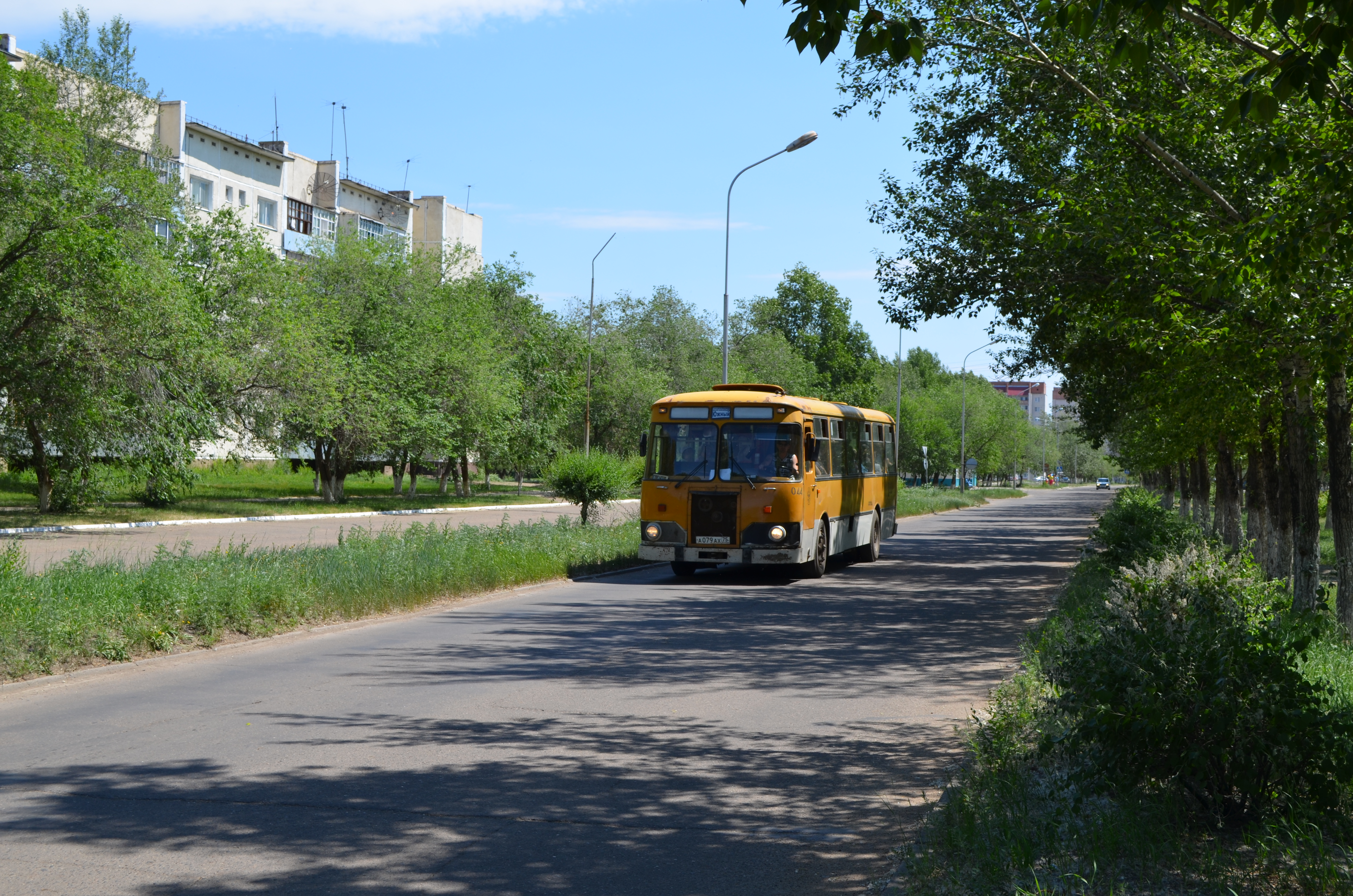

== Sources ==
- В. Кузнецов. Новый городской автобус «ЛиАЗ-677» // журнал «Наука и жизнь», No. 5, 1967. стр.44—51
