= Mezhdurechensk, Ivanovo Oblast =

Mezhdurechensk Междуреченск
- Village
- Location within Ivanovo Oblast Location within Russia
- Coordinates: 56°54′N 40°26′E
- Country: Russia
- Region: Ivanovo Oblast
- District: Teykovsky District
- Time zone: UTC+3:00

Mezhdurechensk (Russian: Междуреченск) is a rural locality (a selo) in Teykovsky District, Ivanovo Oblast, Russia. Population: 201 (2010 census);

== Geography ==
This rural locality is located 7 kilometres (4.3 mi) from Teykovo (the district's administrative centre), 33 kilometres (21 mi) from Ivanovo (capital of Ivanovo Oblast) and 214 kilometres (133 mi) from Moscow. Pershino is the nearest rural locality.
