= Volgabus =

Russian bus manufacturing company

- Company type: Limited Liability Company
- Industry: Automotive
- Founded: 1993; 33 years ago
- Headquarters: Volzhsky, Volgograd Region, Russia
- Key people: Alexey Bakulin (CEO)
- Products: Buses
- Revenue: More than 625 million rubles (2004)
- Net income: 7,000,000 rubles (2004)
- Number of employees: circa 900
- Website: volgabus.ru

Volgabus (known as Volzhanin until 2008) is a Russian automotive company located in the city of Volzhsky, Volgograd region, and includes leasing company, a distribution center, a network of dealers, and logistics center. Its products include buses, electric buses and trolleybuses. The general manager is Alex Bakulin, son of the vice-speaker of the Volgograd Regional Duma.

== History ==
The company was founded in 1993, the first five years leasing buses made by the Likinskiy Bus plant. Volgabus was the first company in Russia to manufacture low-floor buses with aluminum body and electronic control systems. Revenues in 2004 exceeded 625 million rubles. In 2005, they produced 240 buses.

In 2011 it announced the launch of a compressed natural gas-powered bus, in partnership with Gazprom. In 2015 the company had revenues of 3.2 billion rubles, making it the third largest bus manufacturer in the country.

In 2016 Volgabus presented a prototype of an electronic driverless bus at the Skolkovo Innovation Center, the first such vehicle to be developed in Russia.

In 2024 Volgabus presented its first serial trolleybus named "Peresvet" (Пересвет) with Khabarovsk to become the first city to employ Volgabus trolleybuses.

== Products ==
The company currently produces urban, suburban, and intercity buses, and special purpose vehicles under the brand "Volzhanin", or "Volgabus" in foreign markets.

=== Urban buses ===
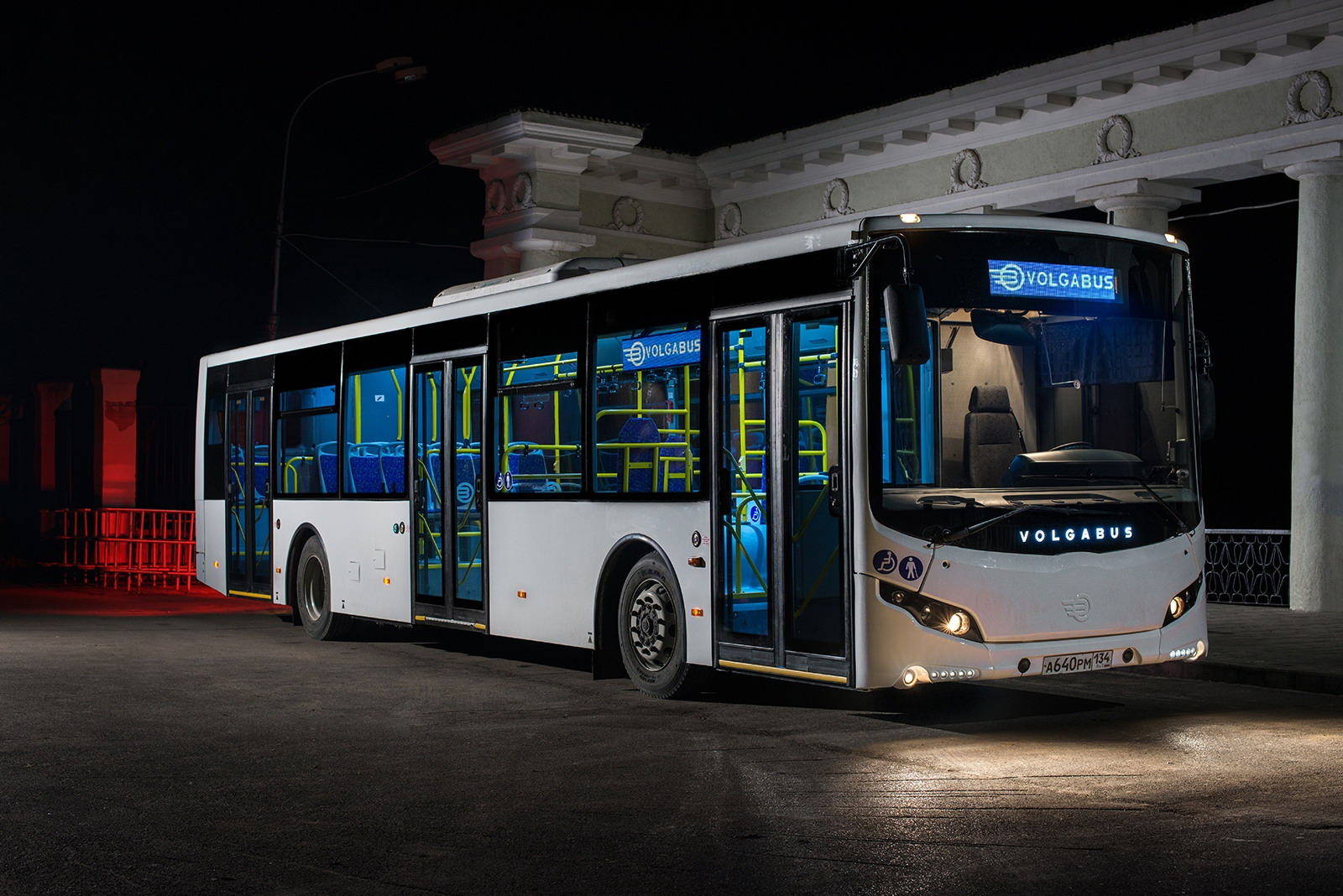
Volzhanin Sitiritm II for 2014 Winter Olympics in Sochi

- Volzhanin-32901 – small alternative to the minibus
- Volzhanin-5270 – large bus, designed for multi-purpose use on regular routes
- Volzhanin-6270 – one-section, large capacity bus
- Volzhanin-5270.06 "Sitiritm-12" – low-floor bus with a body made of aluminum alloy
- Volzhanin-6270.06 "Sitiritm 15" – low-floor city high capacity bus with a body made of aluminum alloy
- Volzhanin-6271 "SITIRITM-18" – urban low-floor bus with extra-large capacity and a jointed body made of aluminum alloy
- Volgabus-4298
- Volgabus-6271 – built upon the technical requirements for Moscow; has an articulated 18-meter stainless steel body, automatic transmission and a new generation of engine, similar to the bus LiAZ 6213

=== Commuter buses ===
- Volzhanin-32901 – small commuter bus
- Volzhanin 52701 – large commuter bus

=== Intercity coaches ===
- Volzhanin 52851 – designed for long-distance intercity routes
- Volzhanin-52702 – mid-range intercity coach

=== Special purpose buses ===
- Volzhanin-52851 VIP – designed for comfort to accommodate business trips of senior executives
- Mobile library Volzhanin 52701 – Library bus
- Volzhanin-6216 Invalid – intercity bus transportation for wheelchair users
- Volzhanin-6216 Sports – sports freight and passenger bus to transport the team Motocross
- Volzhanin-52702 Blood Service – a mobile blood collection point
- Volzhanin-52851 Fire – Mobile fire headquarters

== Gallery ==
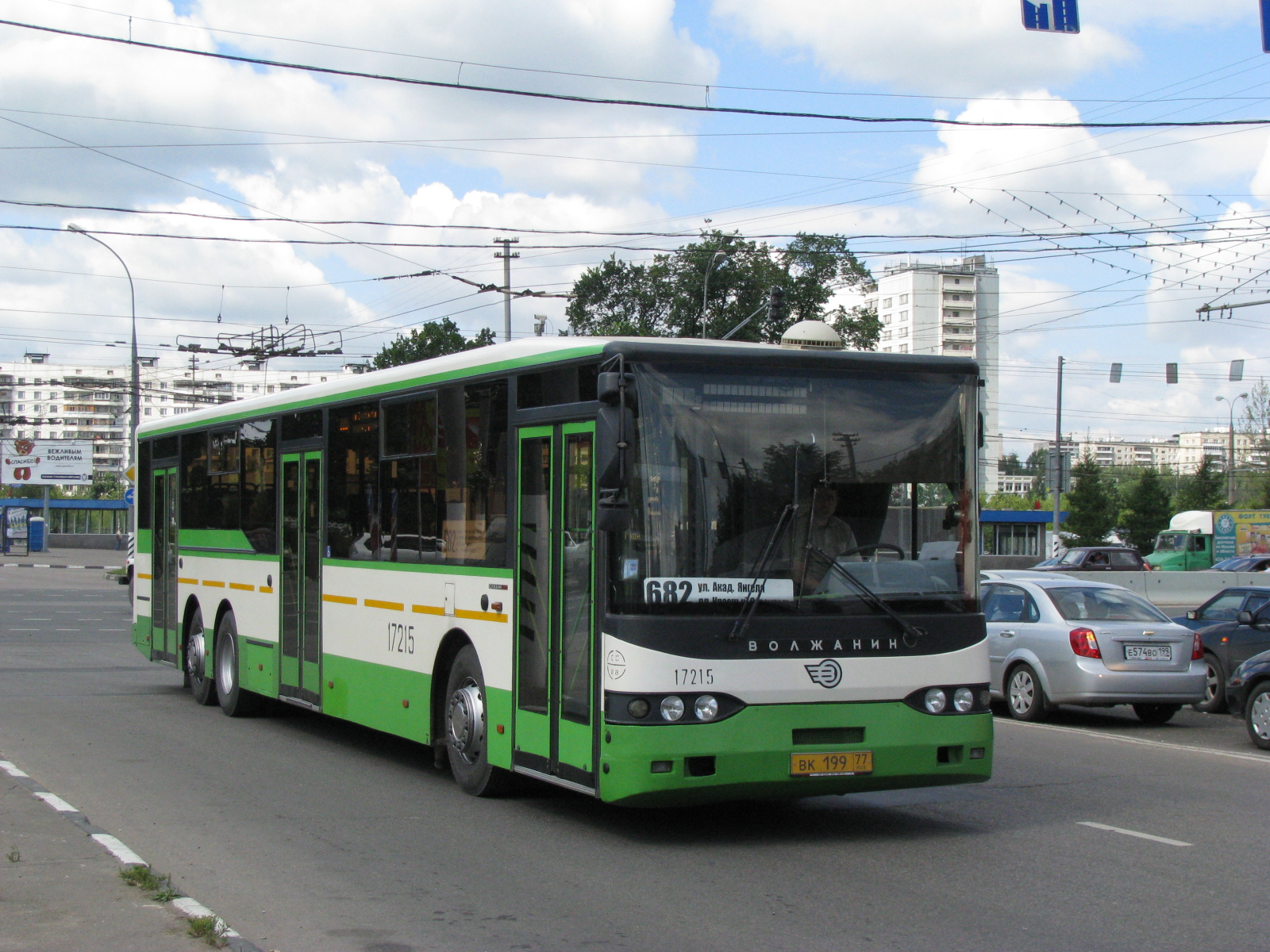
Volzhanin-6270.10

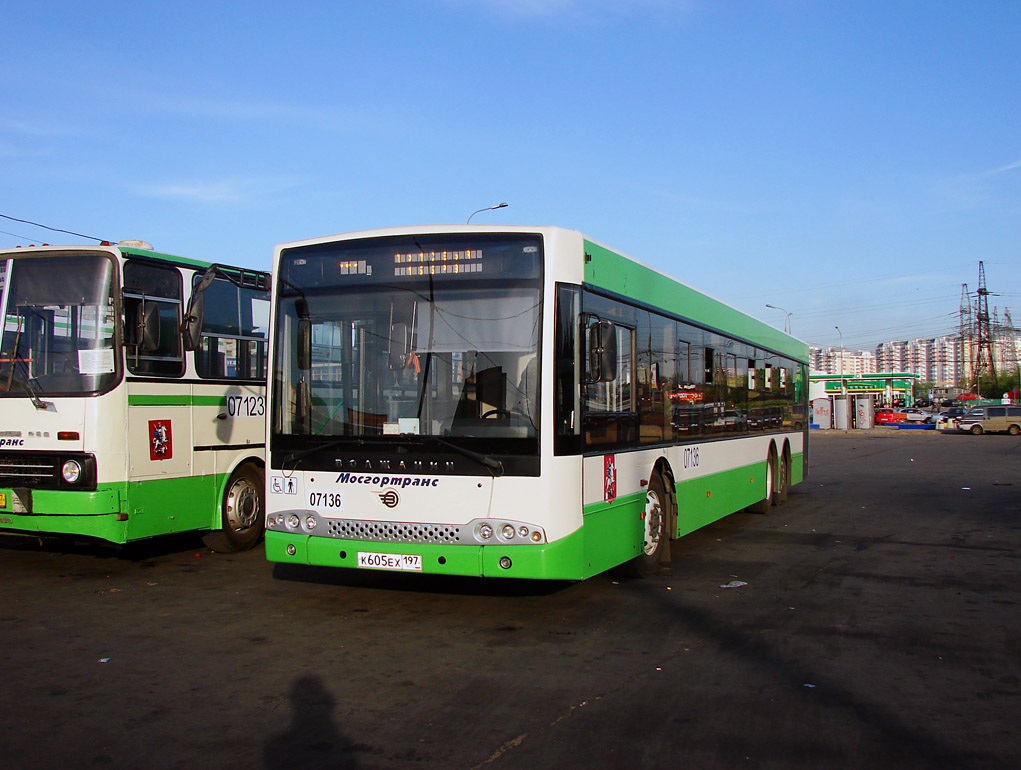
Volzhanin 6270.06 "CityRhythm-15" in Moscow

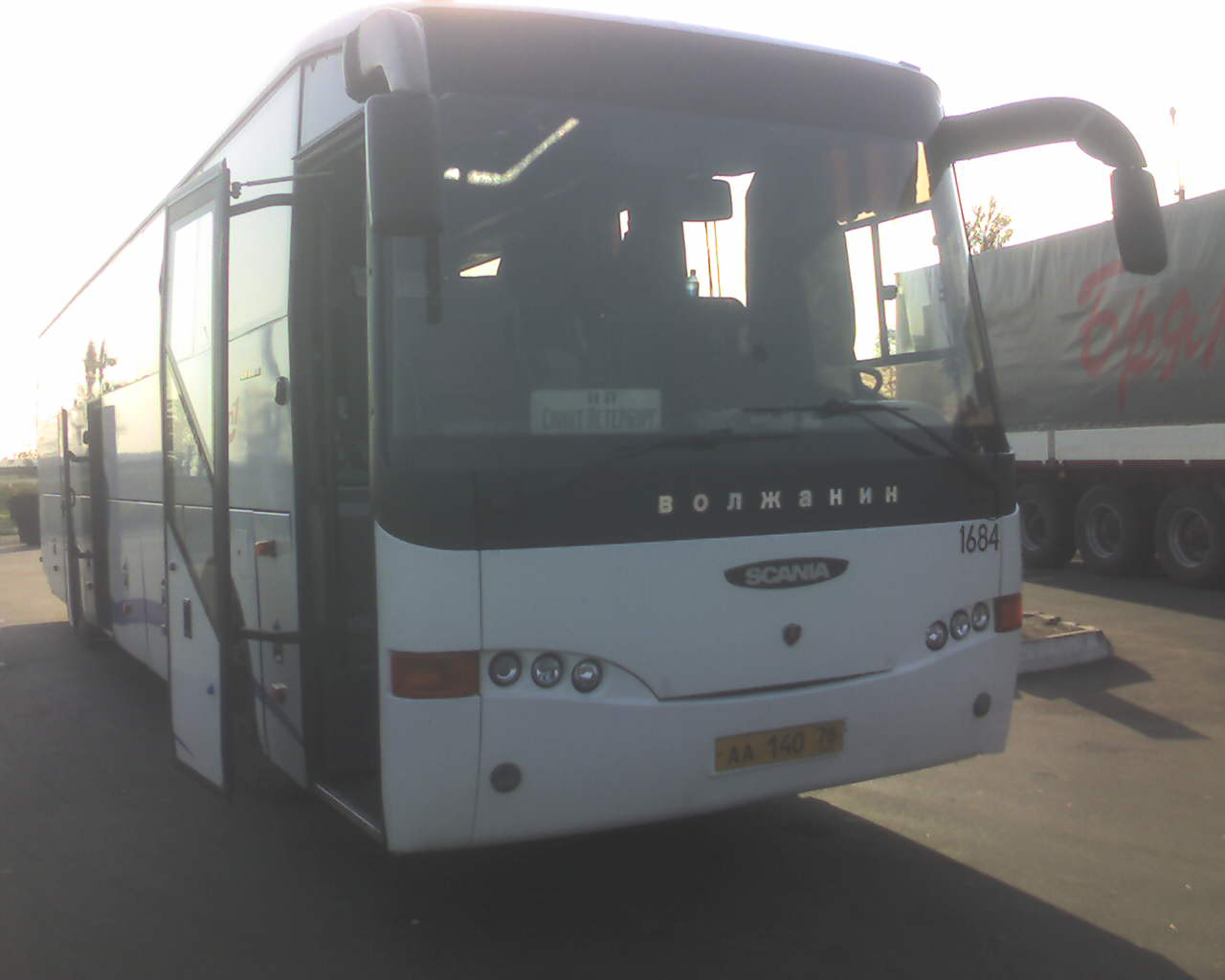
Volzhanin-5285

== Literature ==
- Экономическая энциклопедия регионов России. Южный Федеральный округ. Волгоградская область [Economic Encyclopedia of Russian regions. Southern Federal District. Volgograd Region] (in Russian). Moscow: Ekonomika. 2005. ISBN 978-5282024951.
