= Mezhdurechensky (inhabited locality) =

Mezhdurechensky (Russian: Междуре́ченский; masculine), Mezhdurechenskaya (Междуре́ченская; feminine), or Mezhdurechenskoye (Междуре́ченское; neuter) is the name of several inhabited localities in Russia.

== Urban localities ==
- Mezhdurechensky, Khanty-Mansi Autonomous Okrug, an urban-type settlement in Kondinsky District of Khanty-Mansi Autonomous Okrug

== Rural localities ==
- Mezhdurechensky, Arkhangelsk Oblast, a settlement in Pinezhsky District of Arkhangelsk Oblast
