= Mezhdurechye, Loktevsky District, Altai Krai =

Mezhdurechye Междуречье
- Settlement
- Location within Altai Krai Location within Russia
- Coordinates: 51°05′N 81°45′E
- Country: Russia
- Region: Altai Krai
- District: Loktevsky District
- Time zone: UTC+7:00

Mezhdurechye (Russian: Междуречье) is a rural locality (a settlement) in Vtorokamensky Selsoviet, Loktevsky District, Altai Krai, Russia. The population was 86 as of 2013. There is 1 street.

== Geography ==
Mezhdurechye is located on the Kamenka River, 32 km northeast of Gornyak (the district's administrative centre) by road. Gilyovo is the nearest rural locality.
