= Likino-Dulyovo =

Town in Moscow Oblast, Russia

Likino-Dulyovo Ликино-Дулёво
- Town
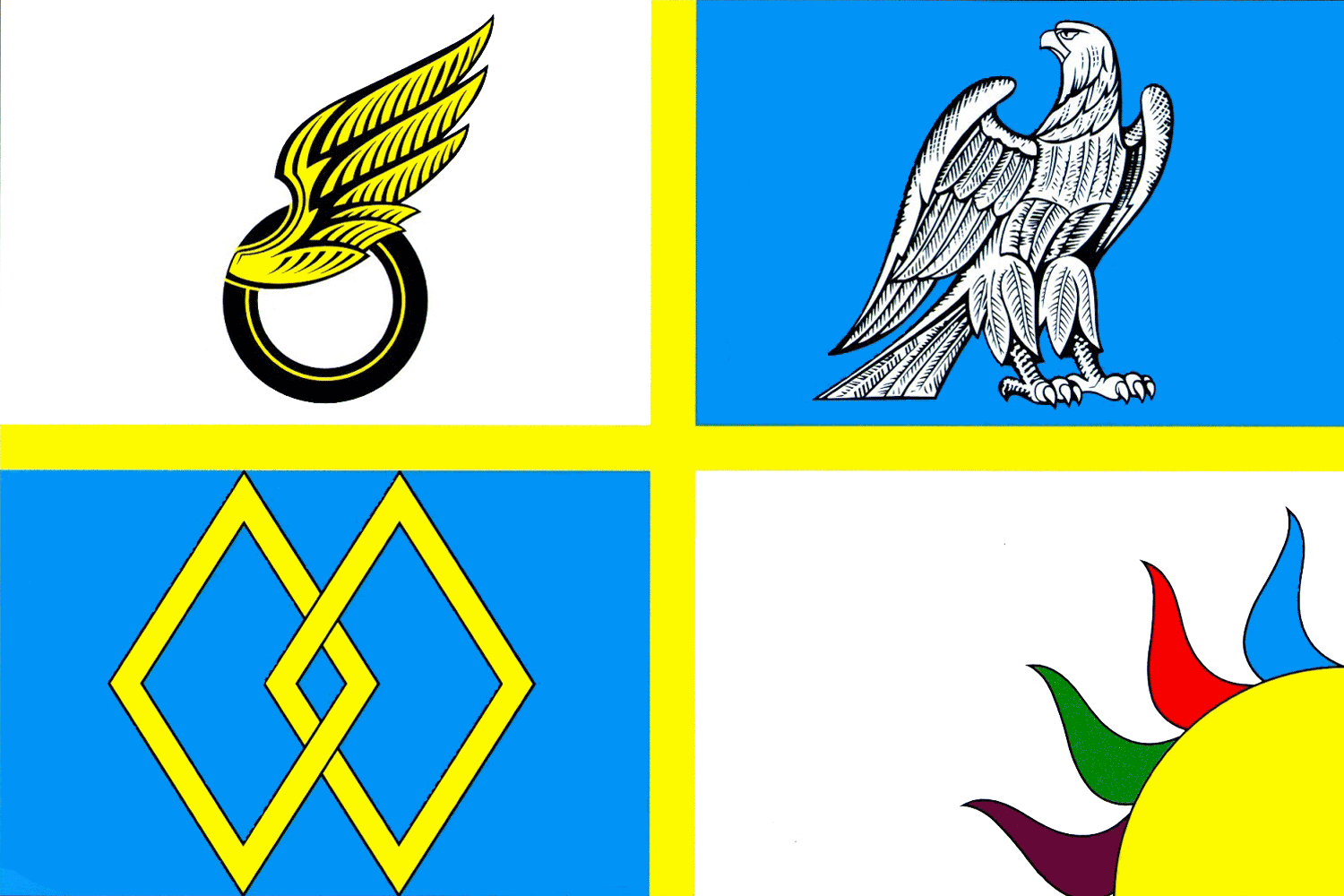
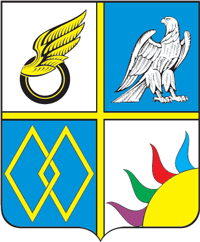
- Flag Coat of arms
- Interactive map of Likino-Dulyovo
- Location of Likino-Dulyovo Likino-Dulyovo (Moscow Oblast)
- Coordinates: 55°43′N 38°57′E
- Country: Russia
- Federal subject: Moscow Oblast
- Administrative district: Orekhovo-Zuyevsky District
- TownSelsoviet: Likino-Dulyovo
- Founded: 1930
- Town status since: 1937
- Elevation: 130 m (430 ft)

Population (2010 Census)
  - Total: 31,321
  - Estimate (2025): 33,917 (+8.3%)

Administrative status
  - Capital of: Town of Likino-Dulyovo

Municipal status
  - Municipal district: Orekhovo-Zuyevsky Municipal District
  - Urban settlement: Likino-Dulyovo Urban Settlement
  - Capital of: Likino-Dulyovo Urban Settlement
- Time zone: UTC+3 (MSK)
- Postal code: 142670–142672
- OKTMO ID: 46757000016
- Website: ld-gorod.ru

Likino-Dulyovo (Russian: Ликино́-Дулёво) is a town in Orekhovo-Zuyevsky District of Moscow Oblast, Russia, located 98 kilometers (61 mi) northeast of Moscow. Population: 31,321 (2010 census); 31,440 (2002 census); 34,203 (1989 Soviet census).

The village of Dulyovo has grown around the Dulyovo porcelain works. The urban-type settlement of Likino-Dulyovo was formed in 1930 by merging the settlements of Likino and Dulyovo. Town status was granted to it in 1937. One of the town products, the LiAZ city bus, was universally known throughout the former Soviet Union.

Within the framework of administrative divisions, it is incorporated within Orekhovo-Zuyevsky District as the Town of Likino-Dulyovo. As a municipal division, the Town of Likino-Dulyovo is incorporated within Orekhovo-Zuyevsky Municipal District as Likino-Dulyovo Urban Settlement.

The town is home to the avant-garde porcelain factory workers' club designed by Konstantin Melnikov in 1930.

== Twin towns and sister cities ==
Likino-Dulyovo is twinned with:

- Aksaray, Turkey
- Székesfehérvár, Hungary
