= GAZ Group =

Russian automotive conglomerate

- Traded as: MCX: GAZA, MCX: GAZAP
- Industry: Automotive
- Founded: 2005; 21 years ago
- Headquarters: Nizhny Novgorod, Russia
- Products: Trucks & Buses
- Revenue: $2.82 billion (2017)
- Operating income: $85 million (2017)
- Net income: $60 million (2017)
- Total assets: $1.92 billion (2017)
- Total equity: $60.3 million (2017)
- Owners: JSC Russian Machines (61%)
- Parent: Russian Machines Corporation
- Website: https://gazglobal.com/

GAZ Group (Russian: Группа ГАЗ) is a Russian automotive conglomerate headquartered in Nizhny Novgorod. It comprises 18 manufacturing facilities in eight regions of Russia, as well as sales and service organizations.

GAZ Group is the leading manufacturer of commercial vehicles in Russia. GAZ Group produces light commercial and medium-duty vehicles (GAZ), buses PAZ, KAvZ, LiAZ, cars, powertrain (YaMZ and UMZ) and automotive components. The market shares of the company: about 50% in the light commercial vehicles segment, 58% in the segment of medium-duty trucks, 42% in the all-wheel drive heavy-duty trucks segment and about 65% in the bus segment.

The main entity "GAZ Group" - OJSC "GAZ", refers to the Office "Management Company" GAZ Group. The "GAZ Group" is a holding company, consolidated around OAO GAZ, bringing together a number of industrial machinery sectors, which are mainly subsidiaries of OJSC GAZ. Management Company GAZ Group was created on September 28, 2006 and is 100% owned by OJSC "GAZ". In 2022, the company's revenue amounted to 4.6 billion rubles.

== History ==
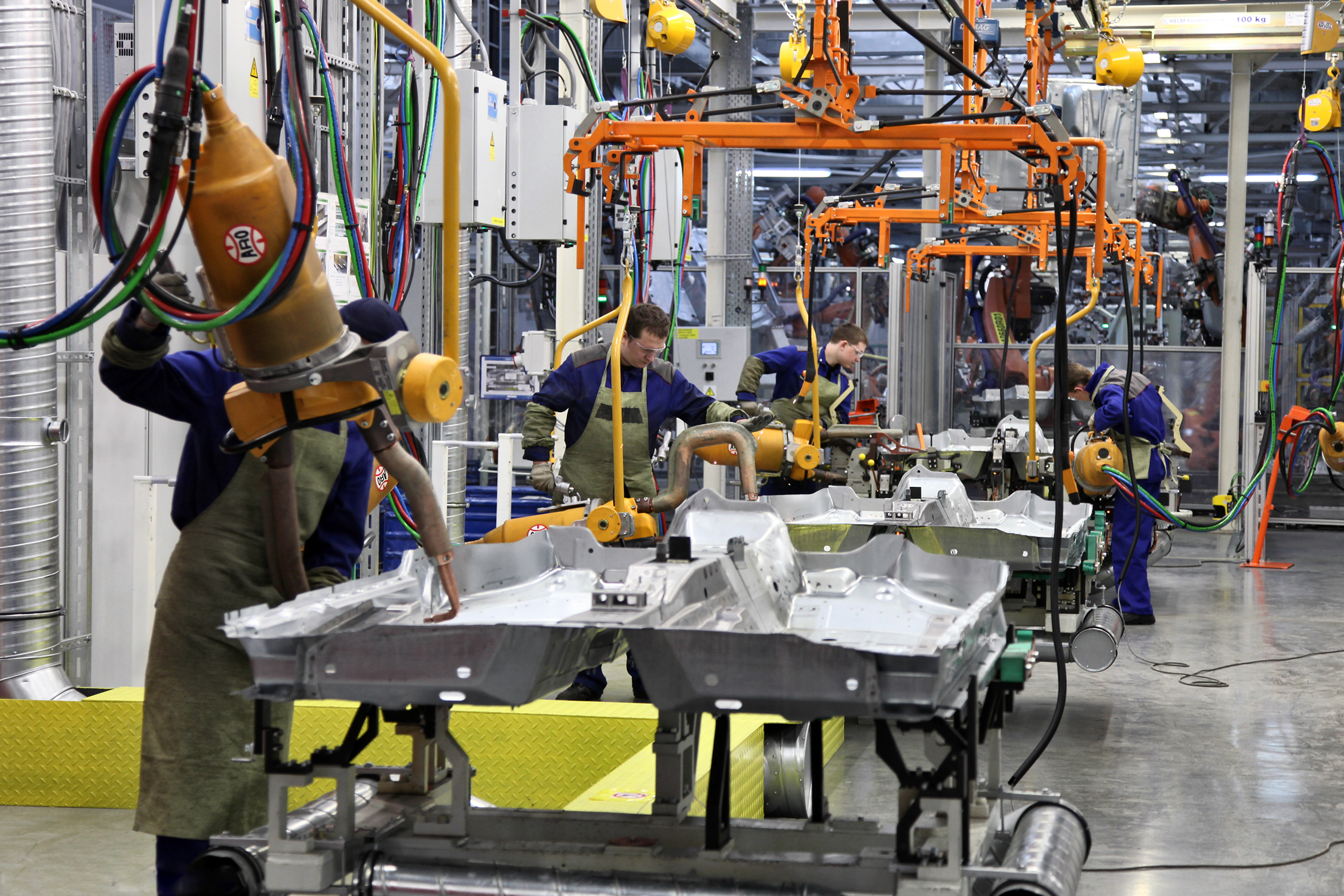
Gorky Automobile Plant

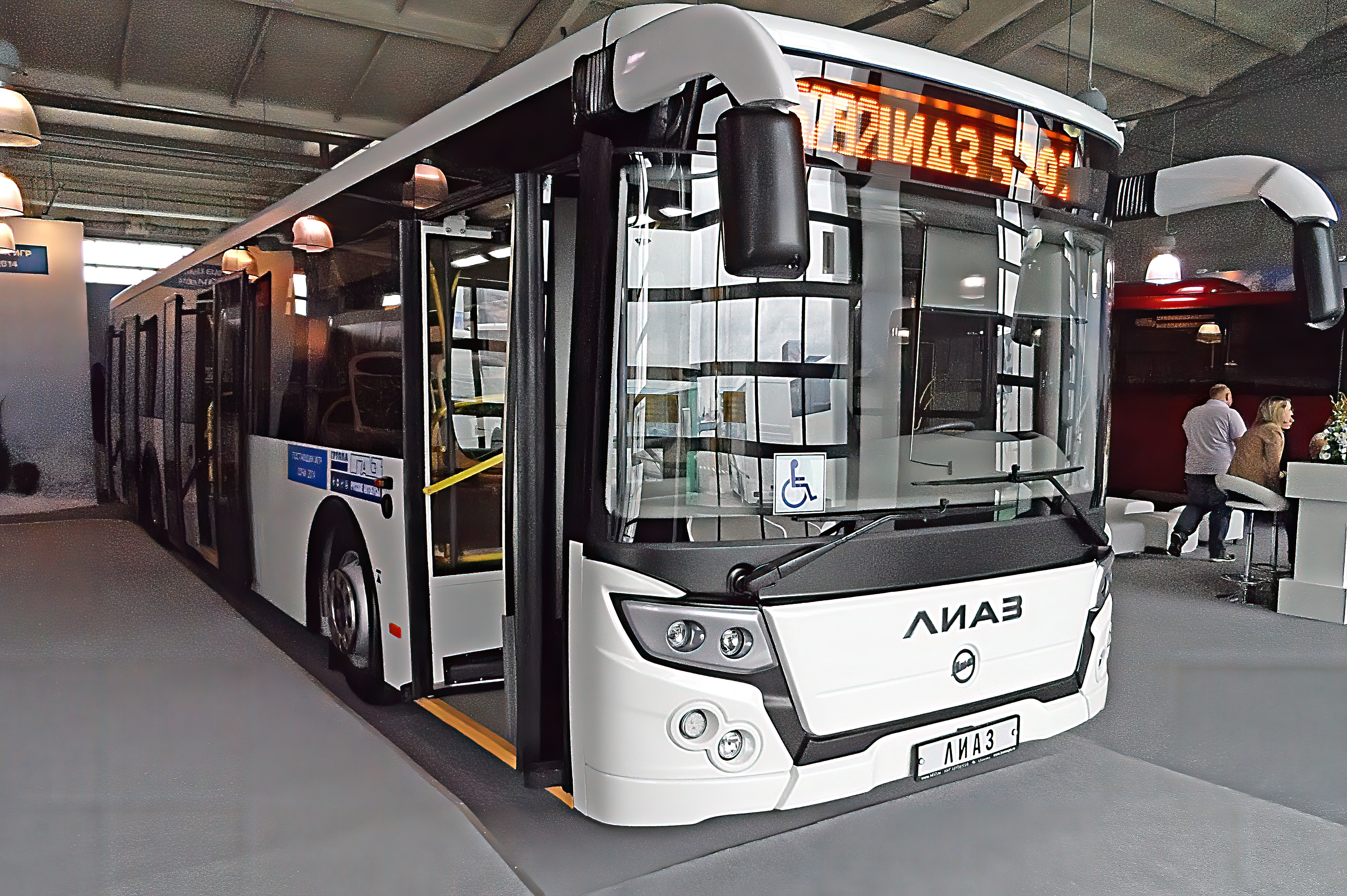
Likinsky Bus Factory

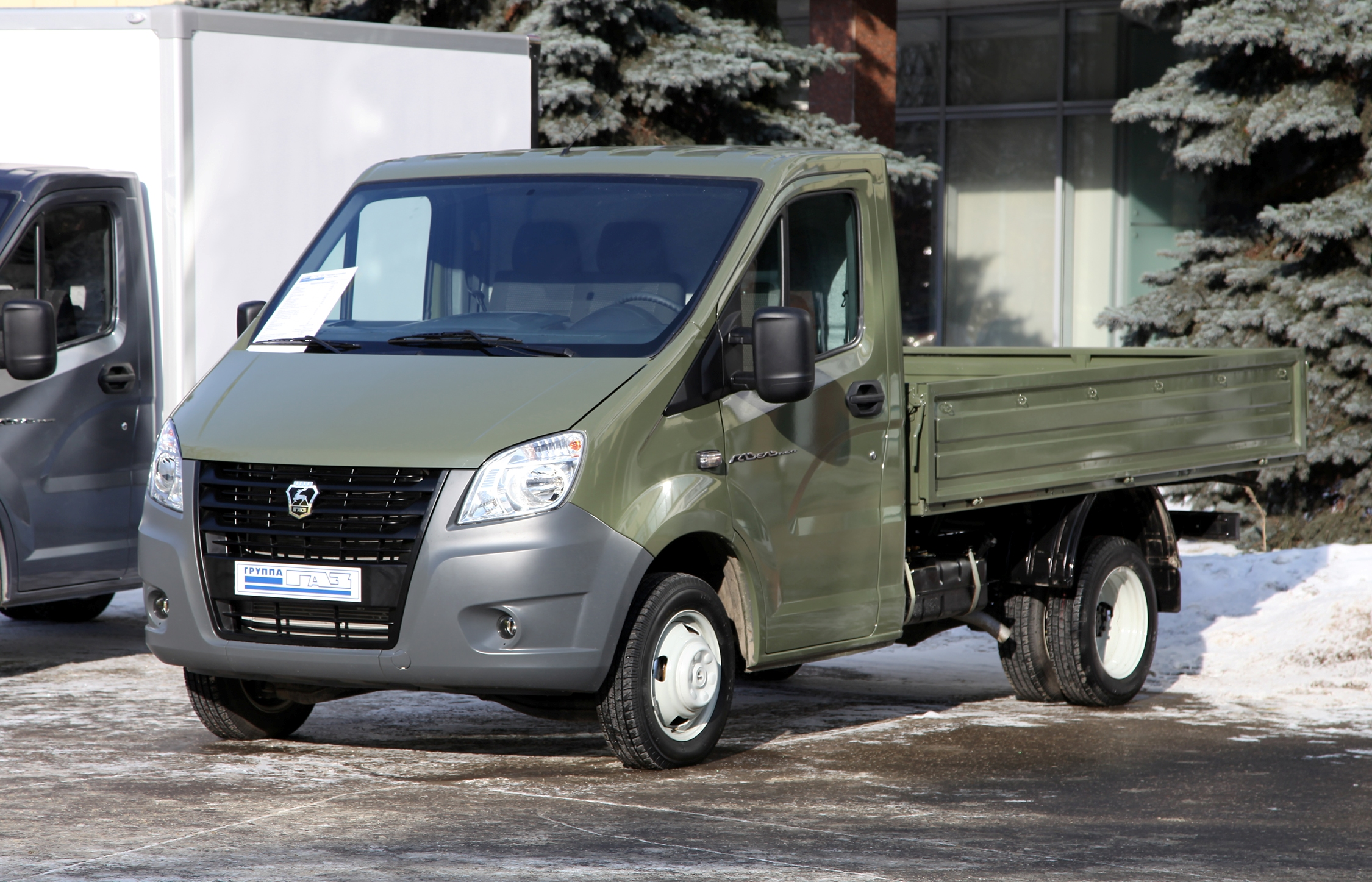
GAZelle NEXT, Gorky Automobile Plant

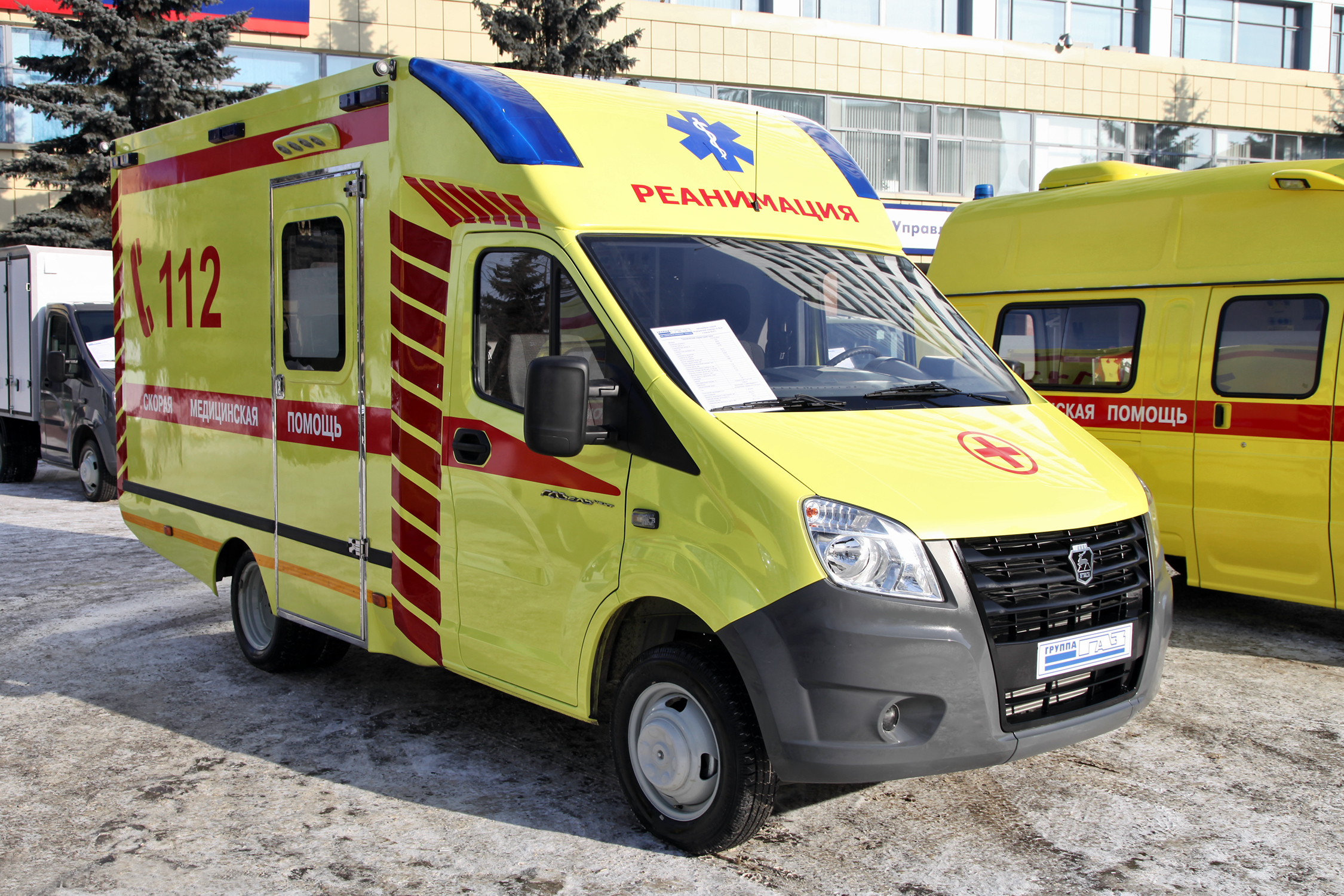
GAZelle NEXT, Gorky Automobile Plant

GAZ Group was founded in 2005 as a result of the restructuring of the production assets of Ruspromavto, which existed from 2001.

In August 2006, Gaz Group's military technology enterprises JSC Arzamas Machine-Building Plant, in Viksa, and JSC Barnaultransmash became the independent Military Industrial Company to ensure the separation of automotive business of Russian Machines into public (GAZ Group) and non-public (Military-Industrial Company) assets.

In the summer of 2006 "GAZ Group" acquired UK based manufacturer of light trucks LDV Holdings (Birmingham) for $40,670,000. In the spring of 2009 in connection with the marketing of the crisis caused by, including the global economic crisis, LDV Holdings came under bankruptcy and in early May 2009, GAZ Group agreed to sell the company to Malaysian carmaker Weststar.

In 2008, "GAZ Group" has agreed to buy 50% of Italian VM Motori and localization of its engines. Closing of the transaction was to take place after the approval of the antitrust authorities. GAZ Group has also entered into an agreement with General Motors who controlled 50% of VM Motori on the basis of co-ownership of the Italian company. In mid-2009, the deal was canceled in the aftermath of the economic crisis.

== Owners and management ==
The joint stock company is managed by the Board of Directors whose Chairman, Mr. Wolf, is the sole executive body is the Management Company GAZ Group.

Shareholders of OJSC "GAZ" are:

- JSC Russian Machines - 61.05% of the ordinary shares;
- Minority shareholders - 38.79%;
- Government - 0.16%

The company's capitalization at the end of the I quarter of 2008 was $3.3 billion.

== Composition ==
=== Divisions ===
GAZ Group is divided into five divisions (activities), the structure of each of which are production plants and sales organizations.

- GAZ Group Auto Components
  - Dies And Molds Plant
  - Kanashsky Auto-Aggregate Plant, bus chassis producers.
- GAZ Group Commercial Vehicles
  - Gorky Automobile Plant (GAZ) - the main company of the Group, accounting for more than half of the turnover of the entire GAZ Group. Production in 2015: 68,857 vehicles.
  - Saransk Dump Truck Plant
  - Ulyanovsk Motor Plant
  - Nizhny Novgorod Motors
- GAZ Group Powertrain Division
  - Yaroslavl Motor Plant
  - Yaroslavl Fuel Equipment Plant
  - Yaroslavl Diesel Equipment Plant
- GAZ Group Bus Division
  - Pavlovo Bus Factory - production in 2015: 5,872 vehicles.
  - KAvZ - production in 2015: 318 vehicles.
  - Likinsky Bus Plant - production in 2015: 890 vehicles.
  - Golitsyn Bus Plant

=== Companies ===
- Abakanvagonmash
- Berezka
- Bosal-GAZ
- CHZ-Turbo-Gaz
- Fuel Supply Systems
- Maxus Rus
- Pit-Arsenal
- Production Association Khtz Belgorod
- Remstroy
- Terex Rus
- Tver Excavator
- United Engineering Center, headquartered in Nizhny Novgorod, consisting of 16 units of engineering plants on 18 July 2007 with the goal of working together to update the lineup Gaz Group plants.
- Zavolzhsky Plant Of Caterpillar Tractors

== See also ==
- Russian Machines
- Automotive industry
- Automotive industry in Russia
- Automobile model numbering system in the Soviet Union and Russia
