= Marshrutka =

Share taxis found in Eastern Europe and the republics of the former Soviet Union

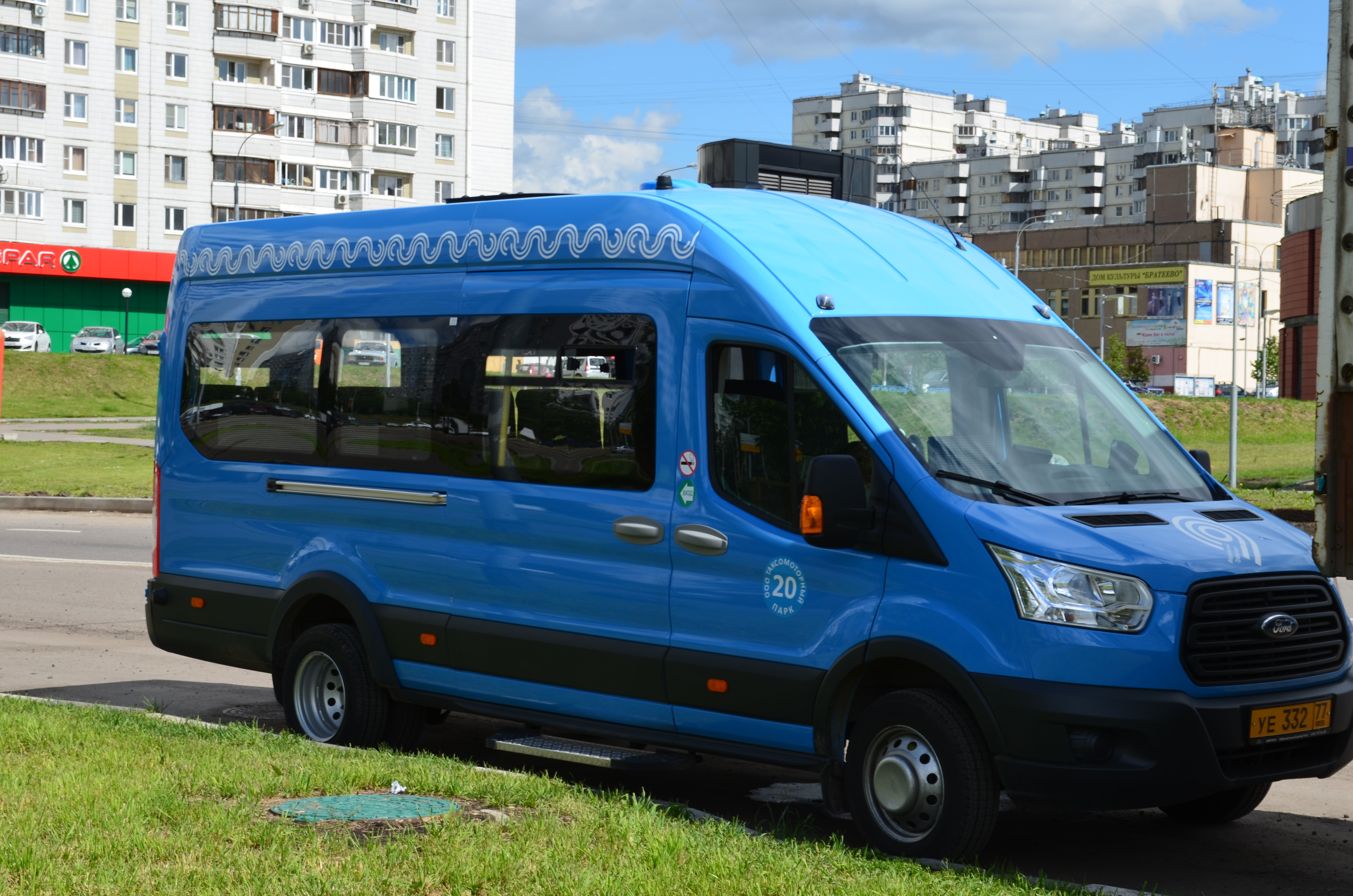
Marshrutka in Moscow, Russia

Marshrutnoye taksi (Russian: Маршрутное такси; Kazakh: Бағдарлы такси, romanized: Bağdarlı taksi; Ukrainian: Маршрутне таксі, romanized: Marshrutne taksi, lit. 'Routed taxicab'), commonly known by the colloquialism Marshrutka (Russian: маршру́тка, Russian: [mɐrʂˈrutkə], plural marshrutki), are share taxis found in Eastern Europe and the republics of the former Soviet Union. Usually vans, they drive along set routes, depart only when all seats are filled, and may have higher fares than buses. Passengers can board a marshrutka anywhere along its route if there are seats available.

Fares are usually paid before the marshrutka leaves; riders near the driver are responsible for handing up the other passengers' fares and passing back change.

== Etymology ==
The Russian word маршрутка is the colloquial form for маршрутное такси, which literally means "routed taxi" (маршрут referring to a planned route that something follows, and такси meaning "taxi"). The word маршрут is from the French phrase marche route, which is composed of the words marche ("a walk, march") and route ("route").

== History ==
=== Early days (pre-1992) ===
"Route taxicabs" were introduced in Moscow for the first time in the USSR in 1938, operated with ZiS-101 limousines. They offered ordinary people a chance to ride in luxurious ZiS cars, otherwise reserved for high officials. At first, they were used mainly for tourists and serviced mostly stations and airports.

Unlike ordinary taxicabs using taximeters, routed taxicab rides are charged by zones, like trams, buses, and trolley buses. The fares were cheaper than those of ordinary taxis but higher than those of large-scale public transport. Unlike ordinary taxis, where a passenger could enjoy a private ride, the routed taxicab would pick up and drop passengers along its route. During communist rule, state-owned taxicab parks operated all marshrutkas.

Outside of Moscow, other large Soviet cities organized routed taxis. For example, Gorky had a routed taxi line between Sormovo and the Nizhny Novgorod Kremlin. As of 1939, the full fare was Rbls 3.50; a similar service cost 1 rouble by bus or 50 kopecks by tram.

During World War II as the Red Army requisitioned cars, routed taxi services ceased. They resumed in Moscow in 1945. Only by the 1950s did they re-appear in most cities where they had operated before the war. ZiS-110 and GAZ-12 ZIM cars were widely used in this role until the mid-1960s.

Routed taxicabs also offered interurban services. From Moscow, they drove to distant cities, such as Simferopol, Kharkiv, Vladimir, Tula, and Riazan. For example, the Moscow-Yalta route operated in the summer, taking two days, with a night stop in Belgorod (near Kursk).

In the 1960s, RAF-977 minibuses became the most common routed-taxi vehicles, replacing passenger cars. Municipal authorities operated the routes. The quality and concept varied greatly between regions. The fare gap between buses and routed taxicabs lessened. In Moscow, for example, the standard bus fare was 5 kopecks, and the minibus fare was 15 kopecks on most routes; in Gorky a regular bus-ride was 6 kopecks, and a routed-taxi ride was 10 kopecks.

Later, the new model RAF-2203 Latvija (introduced in 1976) replaced the RAF-977 minibusses. Eventually, practically all marshrutka services used RAF-2203 Latvijas; many people referred to marshrutkas as "Latvias" or "RAFicks".

=== Marshrutka boom (1992–2000) ===
The introduction of market economies greatly changed the supply of transportation to the urban population in the CIS. The demand for faster and more versatile public transit came to be fulfilled dramatically, while the demand for the underfunded municipal transportation system dropped; people were willing to pay a premium for better service. Although buses (like Ikarus, LAZ, PAZ, RAF, and KAvZ, as well as irregularly imported used minibuses), obtained on a secondary market, had been used by entrepreneurs as a backup on the busiest routes since the early 1990s, it was not until the auto manufacturer GAZ rolled out in 1996 the first mass-produced Russian minibus, GAZelle, that the modern system took shape.

GAZelle was an instant hit as it was a cheap (around US$8,000), easy-to-repair, and lease-friendly passenger minibus with a capacity of twelve seated passengers. Many individual entrepreneurs entered the market, as well as some larger companies. At this time, licensing for public transportation in particular was not required. The vehicle only had to pass annual safety check-ups, which were relatively easy, since local authorities trusted GAZ cars. Moreover, the GAZelle could be easily equipped to run on natural gas.

During this period, most marshrutkas followed well-established public transit routes.

=== Modern days (2000–present) ===
Witnessing the success of privately owned public transportation led to some reaction from the society. Local authorities responded by toughening safety and licensing requirements—like mandatory free transportation of a certain number of disabled passengers upon request and "package deals" in route licensing—tying the privilege to drive on a lucrative route to the chore of driving several not-so-profitable ones. The market became dominated either by large companies or by unions of owner-operators of individual minibuses. Some of municipal public transportation companies entered the business, and prices dropped due to increased competition.

Another consequence was a massive response from car and bus manufacturers. Old manufacturers introduced smaller, more maneuverable models (like PAZ or KAZ) and started licensed assembly of minibuses (KrAZ started assembling Iveco minibuses). Diesel models in the form of the new Isuzu Bogdan, Tata Etalon and others have seen immense popularity. The capacity grew from fifteen sitting passengers to jam-packed small buses of fifty. The busiest routes in major cities now use full-size privately owned buses operating at the same price with municipal companies. The original GAZelle saw a few official modifications to its body, length and passenger capacity to better serve buyer demands, including models featuring diesel engines.

==== Baltic states ====
===== Latvia =====
Historically, marshrutkas (formally "mikroautobuss" or "minibuss" in Latvian, informally "mikriņš", "maršrutnieks") were a common means of transport in larger cities of the Latvian SSR and then in Latvia, the RAF-2203 was the only minibus used for this purpose.

In year 2012 Liepāja included marshrutkas in its bus network by cancelling all 6 routes and making two in their place.

In year 2013 "Rīgas Mikroautobusu satiksme", the company founded by Riga, took over all of the existing marshrutkas routes and old rolling stock was replaced by new Mercedes-Benz Sprinter and Volkswagen Crafter minibuses primary assembled in Latvia by "Universāls" by year 2015. Some of the minibuses included a spot for passengers with reduced mobility with a door in the rear of the compartment. Private companies continued passenger operations illegally up until year 2015. In May of 2018 Riga made it possible to for people eligible for discounts in regular city transit network use some of the routes. On September 9th 2022 "Rīgas Mikroautobusu satiksme" declared bankruptcy and suddenly seized all operations.

Nowadays, marshrutkas are no longer in service in most cities of Latvia, including Riga. Marshrutkas were replaced by regular busses or minibuses with a fixed schedule and fixed stops in places where marshrutkas once dominated.

===== Lithuania =====
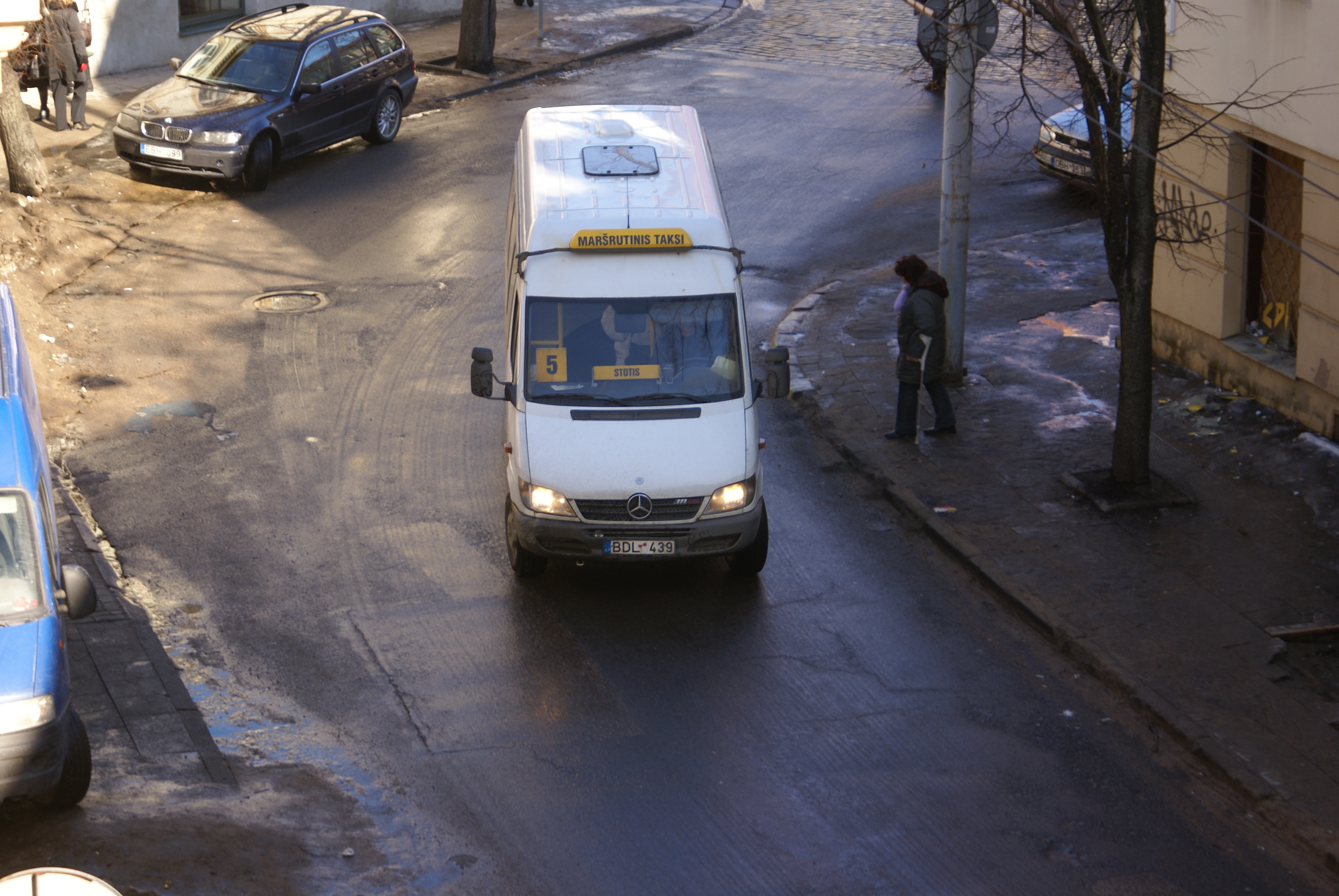
Route 5, once the most popular marshrutka route in Vilnius. Duplicated bus route 26, later, after some changes, ran parallel to it in some segments.

In Lithuania, marshrutkas ("maršrutiniai taksi", informally "mikriukai" - lit. "minibuses") had been in service in a variety of cities since the end of the 1980s, with the largest networks in Vilnius and Kaunas, though also present in Klaipėda, Šiauliai and elsewhere, mostly operating on routes in the city limits with some exceptions. They operated in usual hail-and-ride model, with fixed bus stops only at the start and end of the route, marked with a signpost. In order for the service to be the most profitable, some routes identical to existing bus and trolleybus ones were operated, with the drivers sometimes driving erratically, weaving in and out of traffic, stopping in forbidden locations in order to gain a speed advantage that made them attractive to the passengers. Other kinds of routes were operated on narrow streets in the outskirts of the cities, especially in allotments, where the larger city buses simply wouldn't fit or weren't convenient to operate. In Vilnius, various marshrutka companies (all with similarly old stock) used to operate, which saw a gradual decline in growth since the late 2000s, and completely fell out of favour in 2013, when the city municipality reorganised public transport in the city. The duplicate routes were closed, spiritually replaced by express buses, while some unique routes were added to the city bus system, and operated with smaller buses. In Kaunas, where marshrutka routes were less duplicative, there were attempts to regulare the network, which included a tender to select a single operator, however, the service became unprofitable and was stopped in 2019. The only major city in Lithuania that still operates marshrutkas is Klaipėda, where, since 2018, they are regulated with strict standards, consist of new low-floor stock, and are officially integrated into the public transport system, though only a separate, more expensive ticket is valid.

===== Estonia =====
In Estonia, marshrutkas ("Marsruuttakso" in Estonian) are used in Tallinn. They are mostly used on routes connecting the city to small towns nearby, such as Saku, Saue and Kose where most people have cars and demand for public transport is lower but the many departure times are still useful. Late evening departures may have higher fares because local trains and other alternative means of transportation are not running. In late evening marshrutkas are also a good choice for suburbs where bus services end around midnight, but some marshrutkas continue to run.

==== Central Asia ====
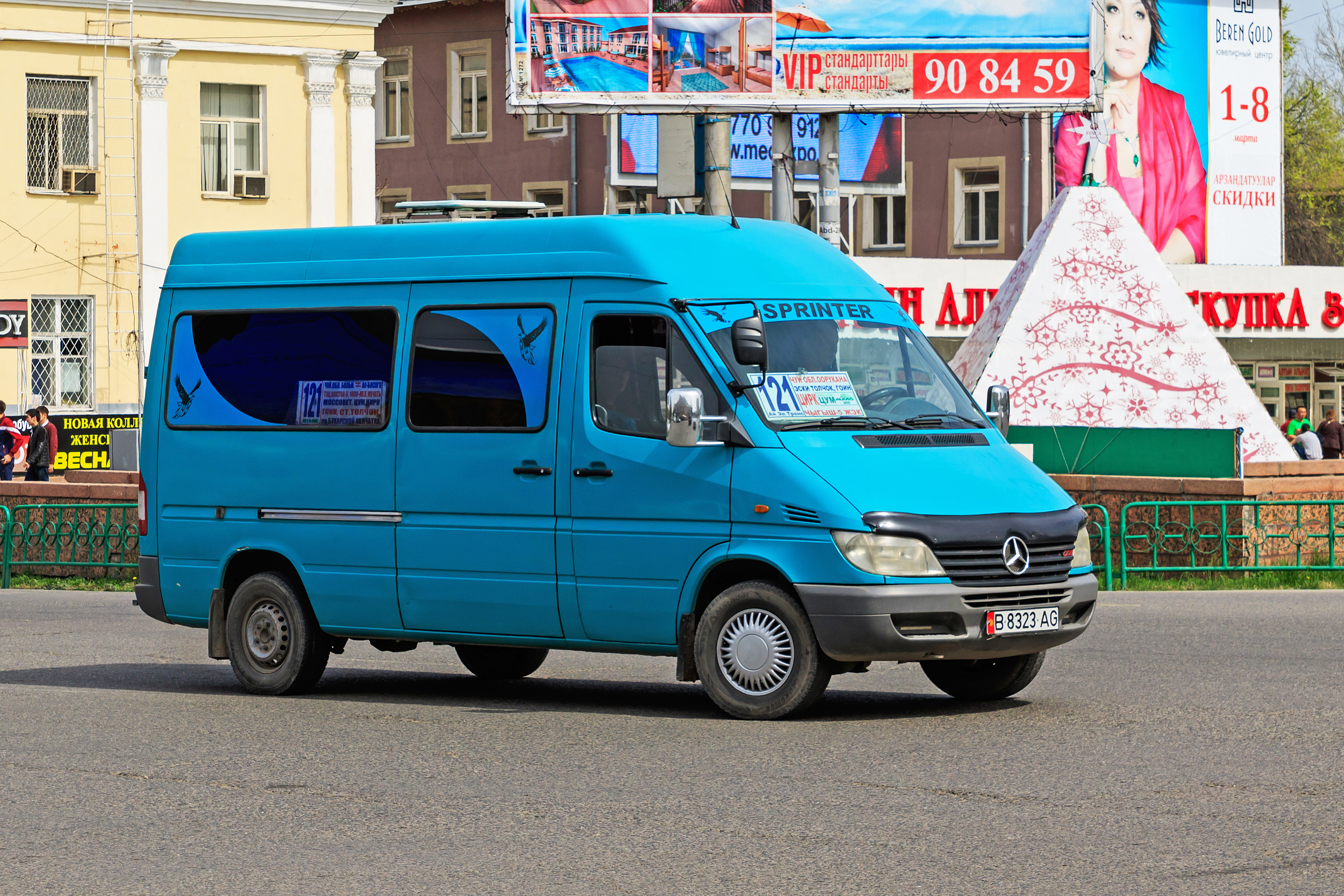
A Kyrgyz Mercedes-Benz Sprinter marshrutka

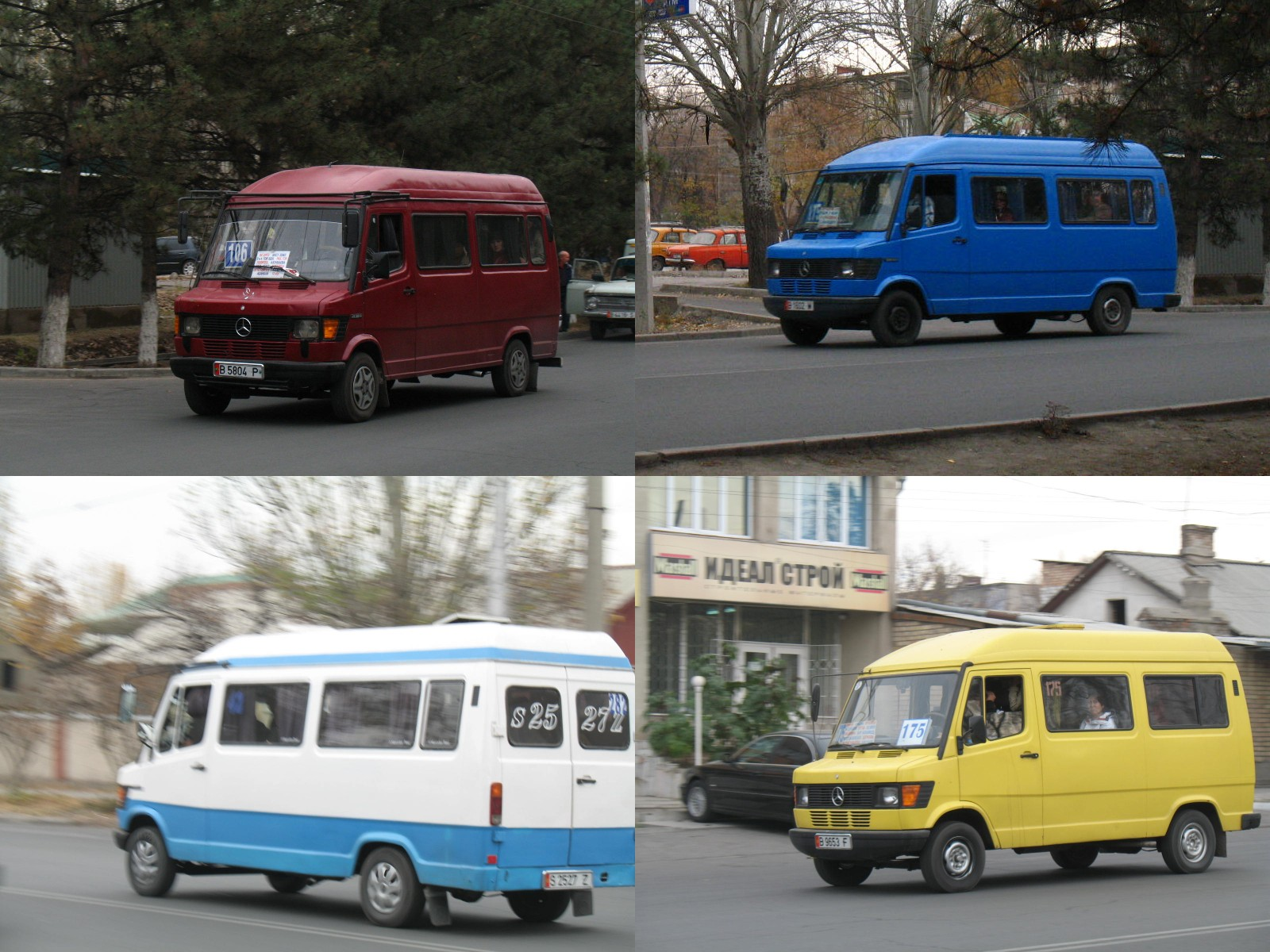
In Central Asia, marshrutkas exist in a variety of colours, yet are fairly consistent in model.

In Central Asia (at least in Uzbekistan, Tajikistan, Kazakhstan, and Kyrgyzstan), standing room is allowed on marshrutkas. Indeed, drivers will often encourage passengers to board the marshrutka and cram together until there is not enough space for another passenger to board. In such a case, once a passenger exits the marshrutka, the driver will stop for others and allow them on until it is full again. Marshrutkas may be boarded at bus stops, but will usually stop at other places if hailed, and often won't stop at bus stops unless a passenger requests an exit or a prospective passenger hails the marshrutka.

Passengers may request to exit at any point but may have to wait until the driver deems that it is convenient to stop.

The typical Central Asian marshrutka is usually a white minibus branded "Mercedes", though may come in any number of colours, sometimes used to distinguish a specific route. The models most commonly used have a vent in the roof that may be opened by passengers if the atmosphere inside becomes too stuffy. Though not the norm, other vehicles are used as well.

Prices range throughout Central Asia, dependent on whether it is a city or village, the local cost of living, the distance covered by route, and government policy.

===== Kazakhstan =====
In Kazakhstan, marshrutkas (Kazakh: маршрутка or бағдарлы такси, bağdarly taksi, 'route taxi') are considered a regulated part of the public transport system and classified under Kazakh legislation as minibuses (Kazakh: шағын автобус, romanized: şağın avtobus), which is officially defined as a bus of a particularly small class, with a seating capacity of no more than 16 passengers, excluding the driver's seat, as provided by the manufacturer. Marshrutka drivers must be at least 21 years old and hold a "D1" subcategory driving license. They must also have at least three years of driving experience, including at least one year of driving "C" category vehicles.

Marshrutkas operate along fixed routes within urban and suburban areas. While it follows a pre-determined path, it typically offers more flexibility than regular buses, allowing passengers to board and exit at various points along the route rather than just at designated bus stops. This flexibility makes marshrutkas especially beneficial in both urban and rural areas, where other public transportation services might not be as frequent or easily accessible. They are faster than traditional buses and remain an affordable option for many passengers. However, they often face challenges such as overcrowding and limited comfort.

Older Soviet-era marshrutkas, such as the PAZ-3205 and Ikarus 260, as well as Mercedes-Benz Sprinter, have gradually been replaced by modern and safer vehicle alternatives for instance such as the Iveco Daily in Astana. In 2005, Almaty took a stricter approach to outdated marshrutkas when the GAZelle buses were banned from city routes due to safety concerns and poor vehicle conditions. Large-capacity buses were introduced to replace them, with an exception for private employee transport and mountainous areas where smaller buses were still necessary. However, the demand for compact and efficient marshrutkas in Almaty persisted, leading to the introduction of the GAZelle NEXT buses in 2018, which gradually entered service in various cities across Kazakhstan, providing a modernized alternative to older marshrutka buses. Additionally, with the expansion of suburban routes in Almaty, the ISUZU HC-40 bus was introduced in 2023 to further modernize the city's marshrutka network. Newer marshrutka buses now feature enhanced safety measures, including video cameras, air conditioning, and electronic fare collection systems, making them a more reliable and comfortable alternative to their outdated predecessors.

Despite the rise of newer alternatives such as ride-sharing services like InDrive and Yandex Taxi, marshrutkas remain an essential part of Kazakhstan's public transportation system, especially in regions with less-developed infrastructure.

===== Kyrgyzstan =====
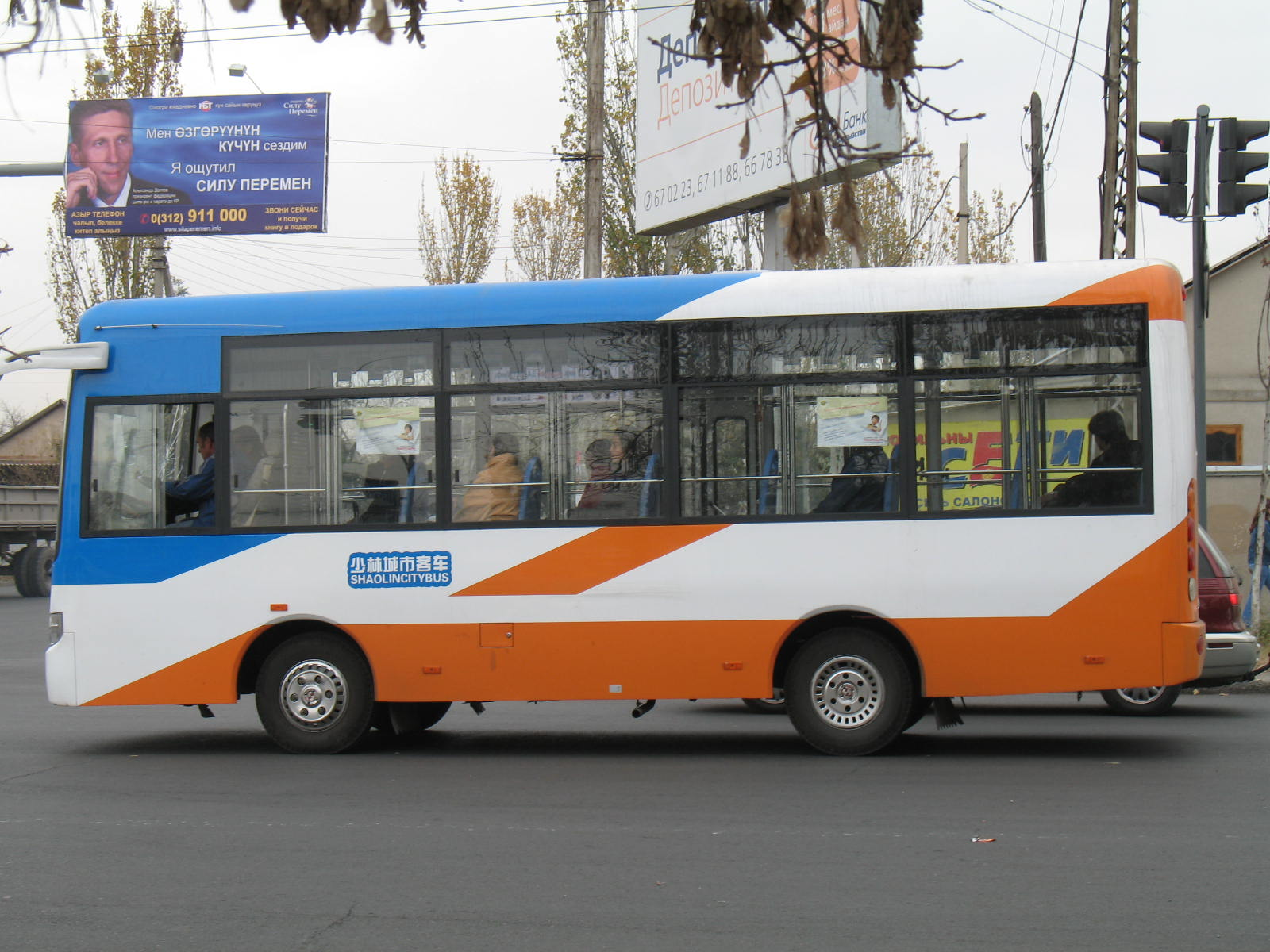
The Bishkek 149 marshrutka, a Shaolin Citybus

The normal price per fare in Bishkek is 15 som and there are no transfers. From Manas International Airport to Osh bazaar in Bishkek is 40 som.

==== Tajikistan ====
Marshutkas operate in the biggest cities of Tajikistan, Dushanbe and Khujand. In Khujand, the standard fare for a marshutka from the city center or the northern bus stop is 3 Somoni (prices as of July 2025). From the city center to the Kayrakkum Reservoir, the price ranges from 5 to 10 Somoni.

==== Eastern Europe ====
===== Russia =====
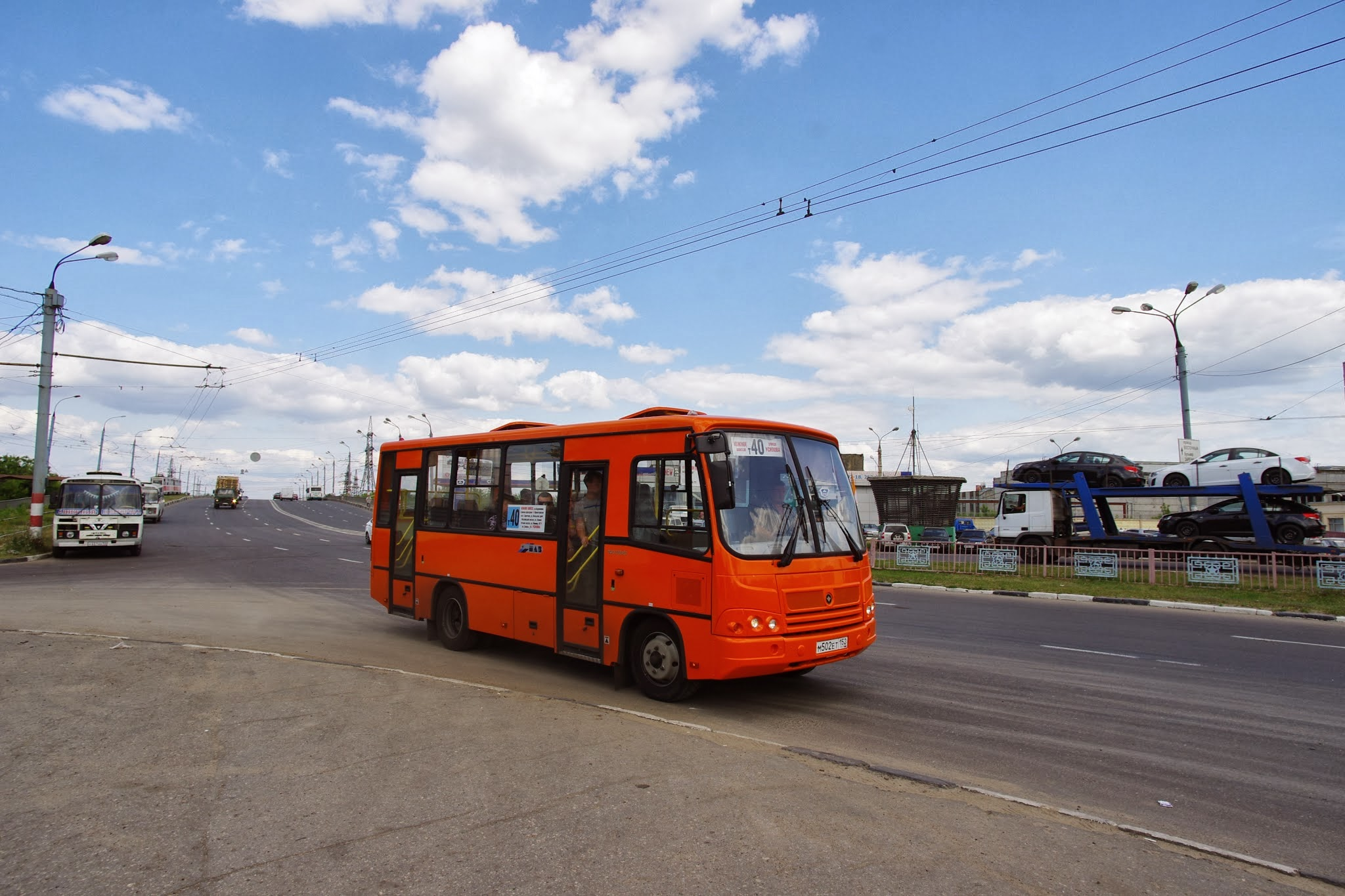
PAZ-3204 near the Avtozavodskaya Metro station. Nizhny Novgorod.

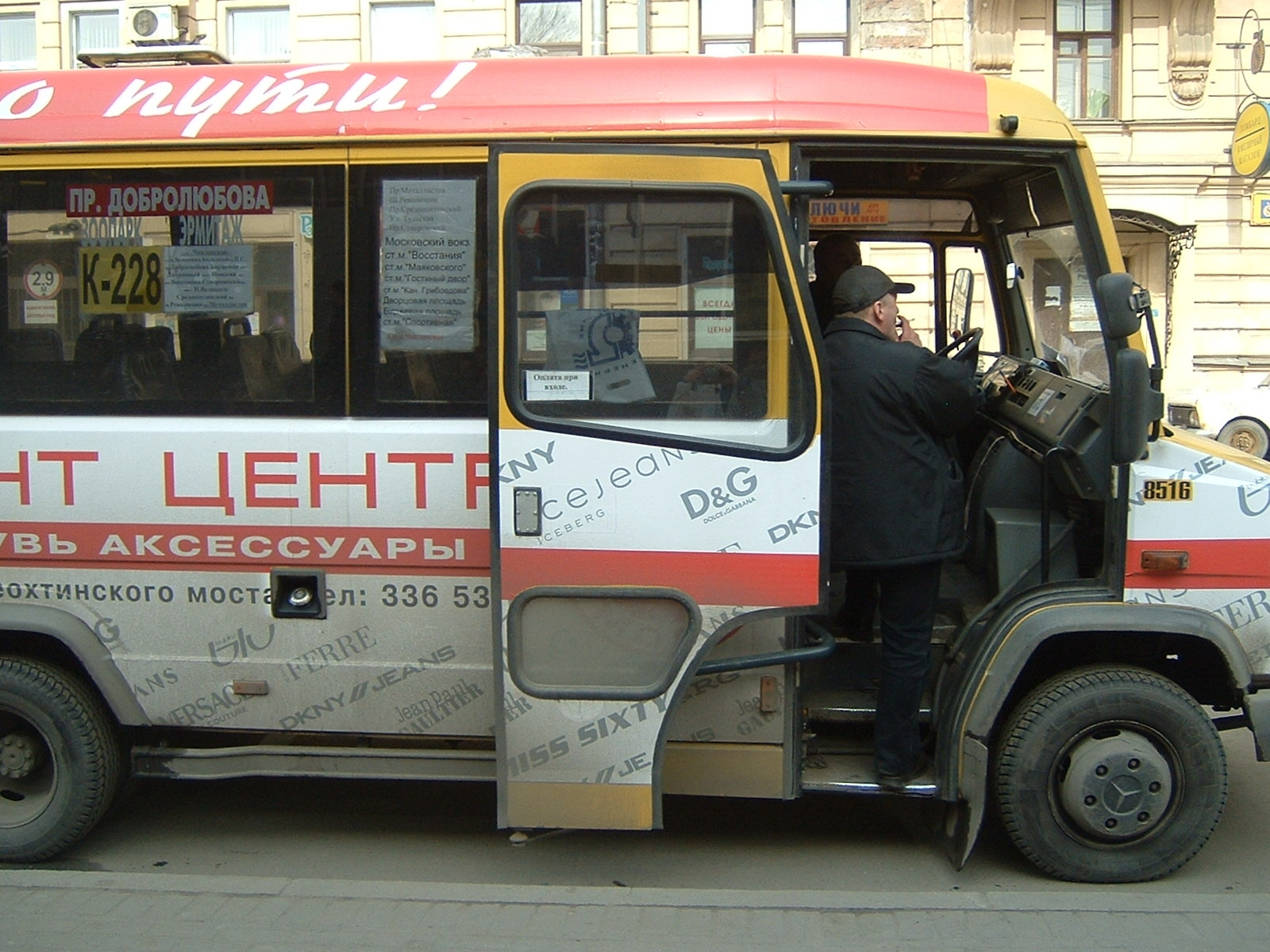
A Mercedes-Benz T2 series marshrutka in Saint Petersburg

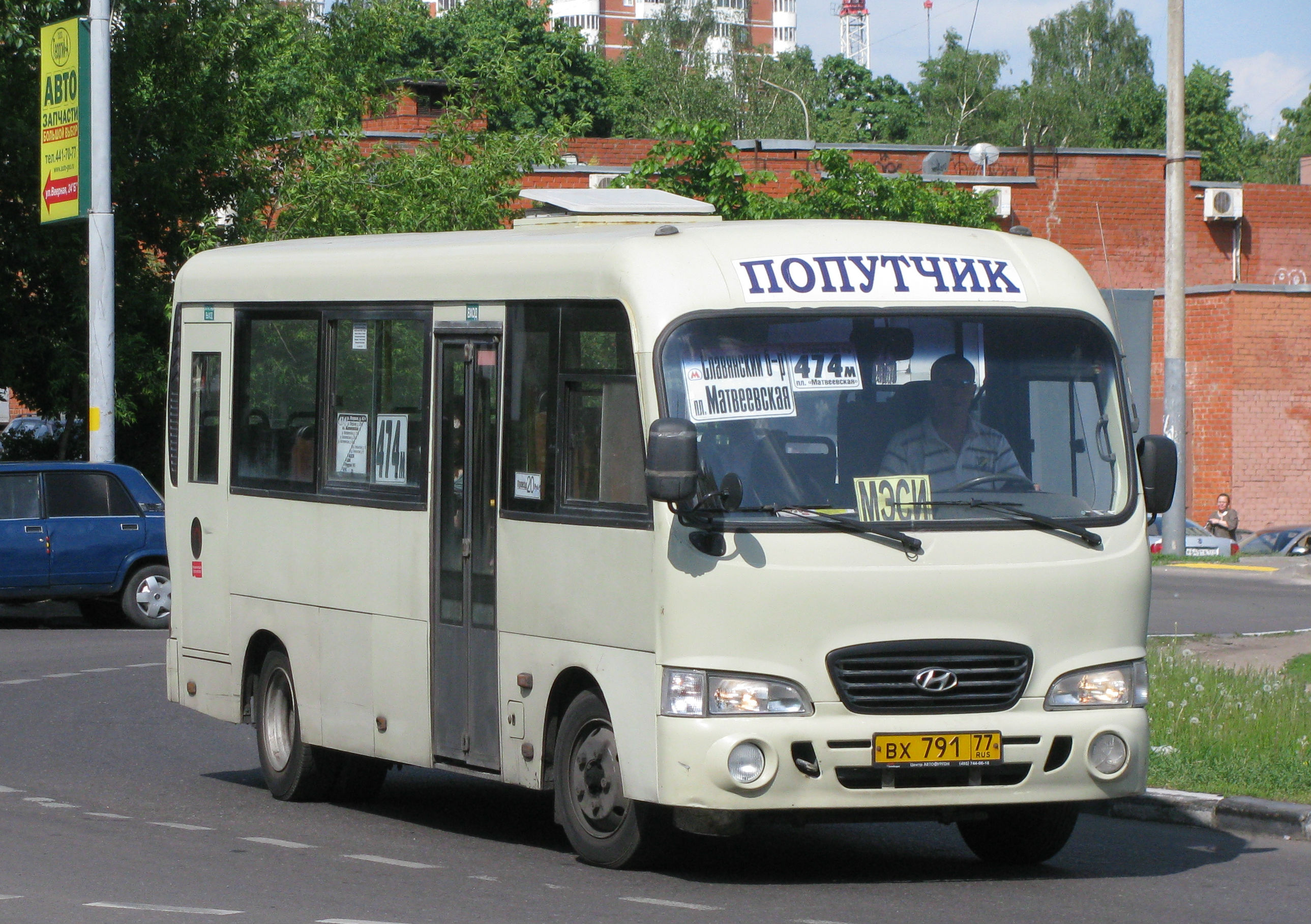
Hyundai County SWB marshrutka built in Russia in Moscow

In Russia, GAZelle, Mercedes-Benz Sprinter, Peugeot Boxer, Fiat Ducato, Renault Master, Volkswagen Crafter, Iveco Daily and Ford Transit vans are usually used as route taxis, although in eastern parts the Japanese minibuses like Toyota Hiace are more popular. Often they (except GAZelle and Japanese vans) are refurbished from vans by special enterprises (such as ST Nizhegorodets, PKF Luidor, Promteh-NN and others) by cutting windows, inserting the glass, installing seats, automatic sliding doors, trim and handrails (are licensed manufacturers of vans for a given activity and are sold through the official dealer network). Route taxis congregate at train stations, metro stations, and transfer points at the end of tram and trolley bus routes. Minibuses are also used, such as PAZ-3205 (in small towns), PAZ-3204, Bogdan, Hyundai County, as well as small buses from China.

In the Gazelle, there are no standing places due to a lack of height and if the cabin is filled, they do not stop at the request of people standing at the bus stops, only stopping when one or more seats become vacant (the driver monitors the filling and turns away extra passengers at the entrance). In other shuttles passengers can board standing places, regardless of occupancy of the seats. The taxi will skip stops if they are not requested and, if operated with a GAZelle or similar, bypass hailing riders until it has empty seats. The fare is commonly one and a half or twice the fare of a regular bus.

The appeal for the route taxi is that it is considered to be a faster ride in less-crowded conditions than regular transport; the taxi routes that follow cross-city routes are most often the fastest means of mass transport. Also, collapse of municipal transport services in many cities made it absolutely impractical to commute without the help of marshrutkas at all.

Marshrutkas are banned from operations within Moscow and Saint Petersburg. However, marshrutkas with routes leading to or originating from Moscow Oblast are allowed to operate in the city and are common in the districts bordering Moscow Oblast such as Vykhino-Zhulebino, Novokosino or Levoberezhny.

It is relatively cheap and fast to ride a marshrutka. The only drawback, sometimes noted by foreigners, is the poor noise insulation, which means you have to practically scream at the driver to request a stop. Mini marshrutkas were built in Russia in 2019.

===== Ukraine =====
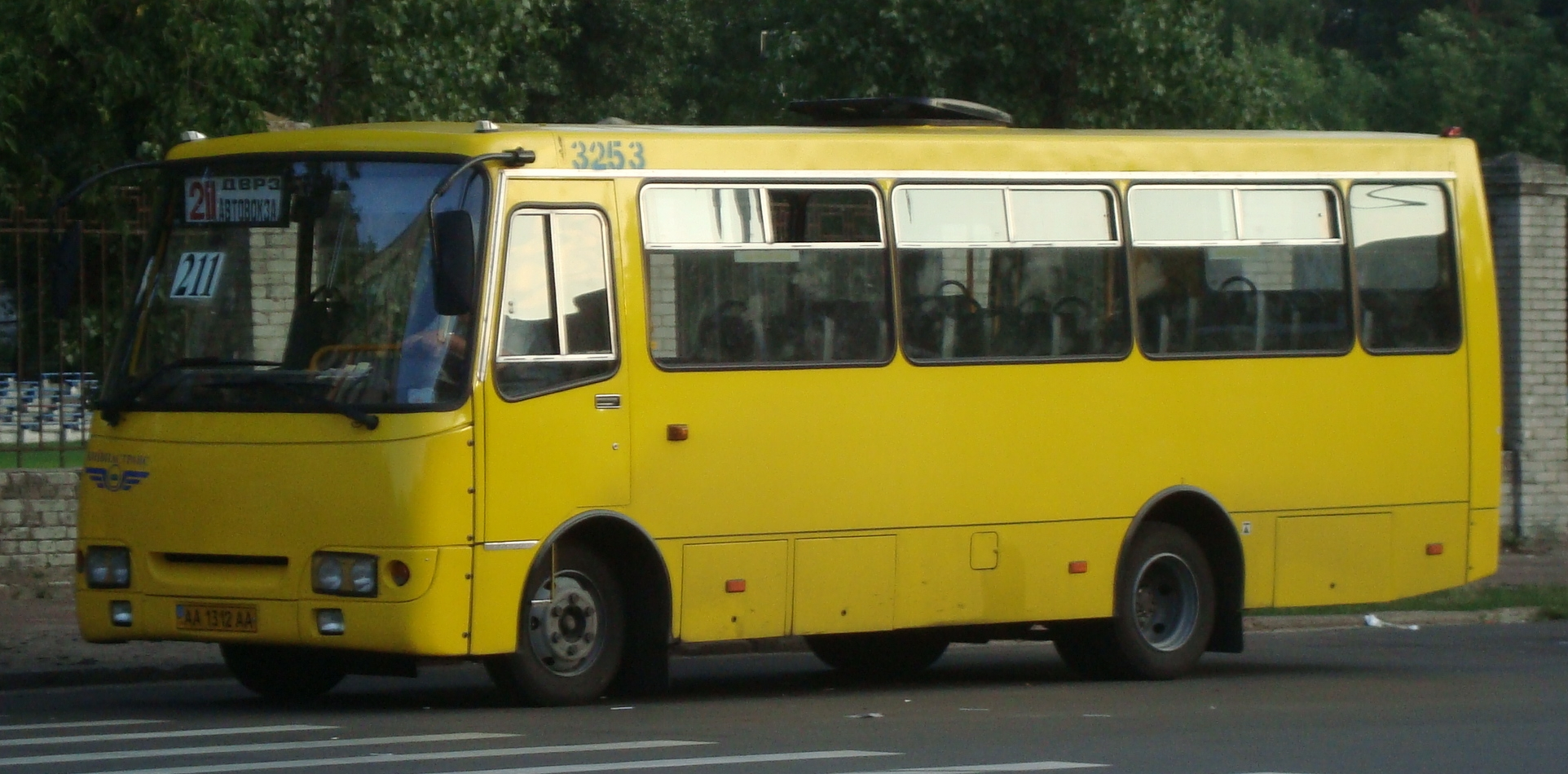
The Isuzu-based Bohdan A092 is used for most of Kyiv's marshrutkas.

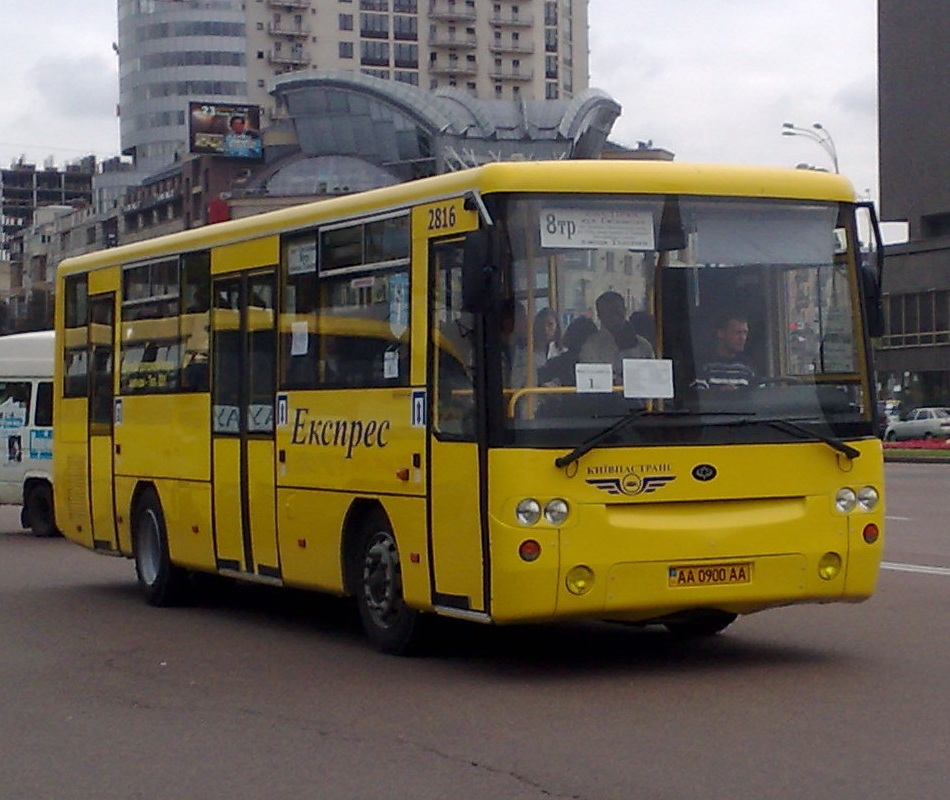
Some Kyiv marshrutka routes use the bigger Bohdan A145.

In Ukraine, the Bogdan A091 and A092 buses are the most common route taxi which can be found operating in towns and cities. Generally the fare is higher than city owned public buses. Alighting the bus is possible regardless of the designated bus stop, but generally this is up to driver's discretion. State Automobile inspection (ДАІ) forbids picking up passengers outside of the bus stops. Marshrutkas do not require tickets, although a passenger can ask for a ticket when paying the fare as a receipt for expense claim purposes.

Etalons and Bogdans usually have a conductor on board selling the tickets. In the GAZelle or converted van, the fare is paid directly to the driver, either upon pickup or departure of the passenger. It is common etiquette for passengers to relay the fare of fellow passengers to the driver, and the change back on crowded buses.

====== "Everybody pays" fast buses ======
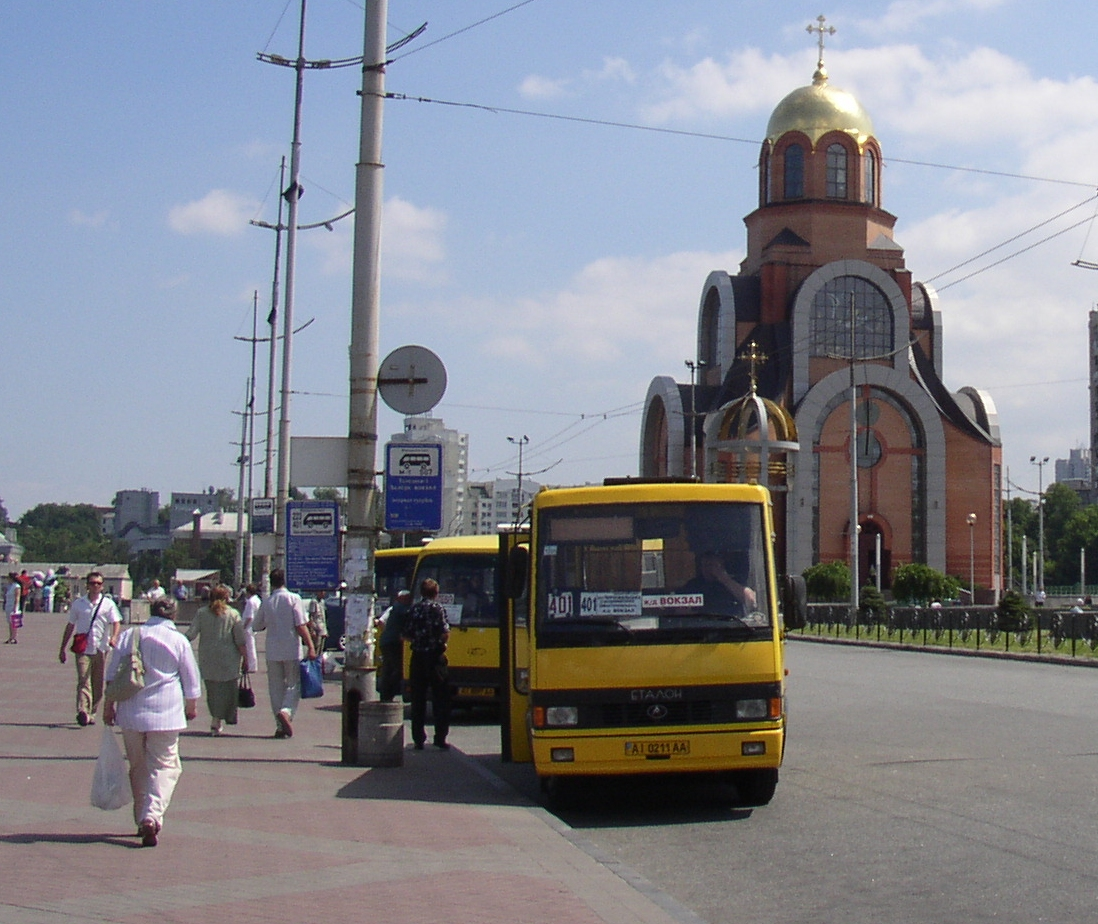
BAZ-A079 Etalon (Tata chassis) (in front) and Bogdan A091 (Isuzu chassis) (behind) marshrutkas. Photo taken at Vokzal plaza, Kyiv.

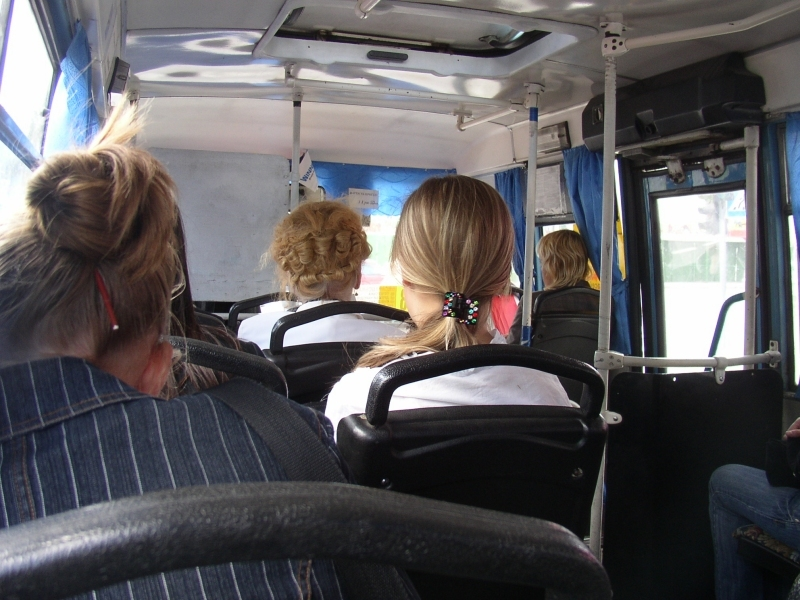
Interior view of a typical Ukrainian Bogdan A091/A092 marshrutka

In Kyiv, Ukraine and other cities, marshrutkas evolved into "everybody pays" fast buses. The public route microbuses can be small, medium-size, and sometimes big buses, with a higher fare than on ordinary municipally funded buses. They also do not take month subscription tickets. Depending on the city, persons with disabilities, students, law enforcement workers, and civil servants (pass holders) ride for free. Marshrutkas will not take more free passengers (e.g. disabled) than the strictly limited quantity of one per vehicle, while in ordinary buses, trolleybuses and trams the number is not limited and more categories of people (pensioners, etc.) have the right to ride for free. This is why there are many times more marshrutkas in the city than ordinary buses, trolleybuses and trams altogether.

Since municipally funded buses must transport pass holders for free, pass holders prefer using municipal buses to private buses. The lack of marshrutkas' free-ride obligations is because they are classed as "taxis." Ordinary municipal buses, which are usually "full of free riders", are as a result unprofitable and cause economic loss. If a marshrutka charges the same fare as a municipal bus, the marshrutka will profit more, since there is an effective doubling of the profit due to there being one or no free pass riders on board.

Marshrutka usually operate faster and with greater frequency than ordinary buses. Stopping marshrutka in the city, at established stops, comes out of practice, being difficult because of the large number of passengers and the high frequency of the stops.

In the 1990s when local authorities temporarily lost their ability to finance city bus work, the bus drivers installed tablets with the inscription "Taxomotor" in their bus windows. That meant that every passenger had to pay the fare.

===== Belarus =====
In Minsk, Belarus, the fleet of vehicles is the same as Russia, consisting of Mercedes-Benz Sprinter and Ford Transit.

===== Moldova =====
In Moldova, rutierele run all over the capital and to most large cities in the country. Most rutierele are white and have only the roof vent and front windows for airflow. Rutierele will usually seat around 16 people with space for another 15 to 20 to stand while holding railing.

==== South Caucasus ====
===== Armenia =====
In Yerevan, Armenia, marshrutkas (Armenian: մարշրուտկա maršrutka or երթուղային տաքսի ert’uġayin tak'si) fares are paid when the passenger exits. There are no tickets issued. Marshrutkas can be hailed anywhere along their route, though they do have specific stops and riders can exit at any point if the driver is willing to pull over. While the law requires that marshrutkas stop only at designated stops while on major streets, compliance with this law depends on the driver and the degree of police enforcement at any given time.

Marshrutkas are the primary form of vehicular intercity transit in Armenia (outside of the Ararat Valley, where some full-sized bus lines operate). From most bus stations in Armenia, it is possible to find marshrutka routes connecting to several nearby small or mid-size cities.

===== Azerbaijan =====
In Azerbaijan, marshrutkas (Azerbaijani: marşrutka or marşrut taksi, 'route taxi') are a widely used form of public transportation, especially in urban and rural areas. Under 2009 Azerbaijani law, these minibuses or shared taxis follow specific routes but, unlike traditional buses, they do not have fixed stops, allowing passengers the flexibility to board or disembark at virtually any point along the way. Marshrutkas are typically smaller than regular buses, with a passenger capacity of no more than 17.

In cities with populations of 500,000 or more, marshrutkas operate primarily through large passenger hubs such as railway stations, bus stations, airports, and shopping centers. These hubs help connect different settlements, villages, and other locations within the city's administrative boundaries. The buses operating in route taxi mode are marked with the identification "MT" on their route boards and the inscription "MARŞRUT TAKSİ" on their bodies to distinguish them from regular buses.

In terms of fare regulations, children under 5 years old can travel for free as long as they don't occupy a seat. If they do, a child ticket is required. When several children under 5 travel with a passenger, each child, except one, must have a child ticket, while children aged 5 to 10 also need a child ticket. For children over 10, the full fare applies. On marshrutkas, children's tickets are not used, and any child occupying a seat must purchase a full ticket regardless of age.

===== Georgia =====
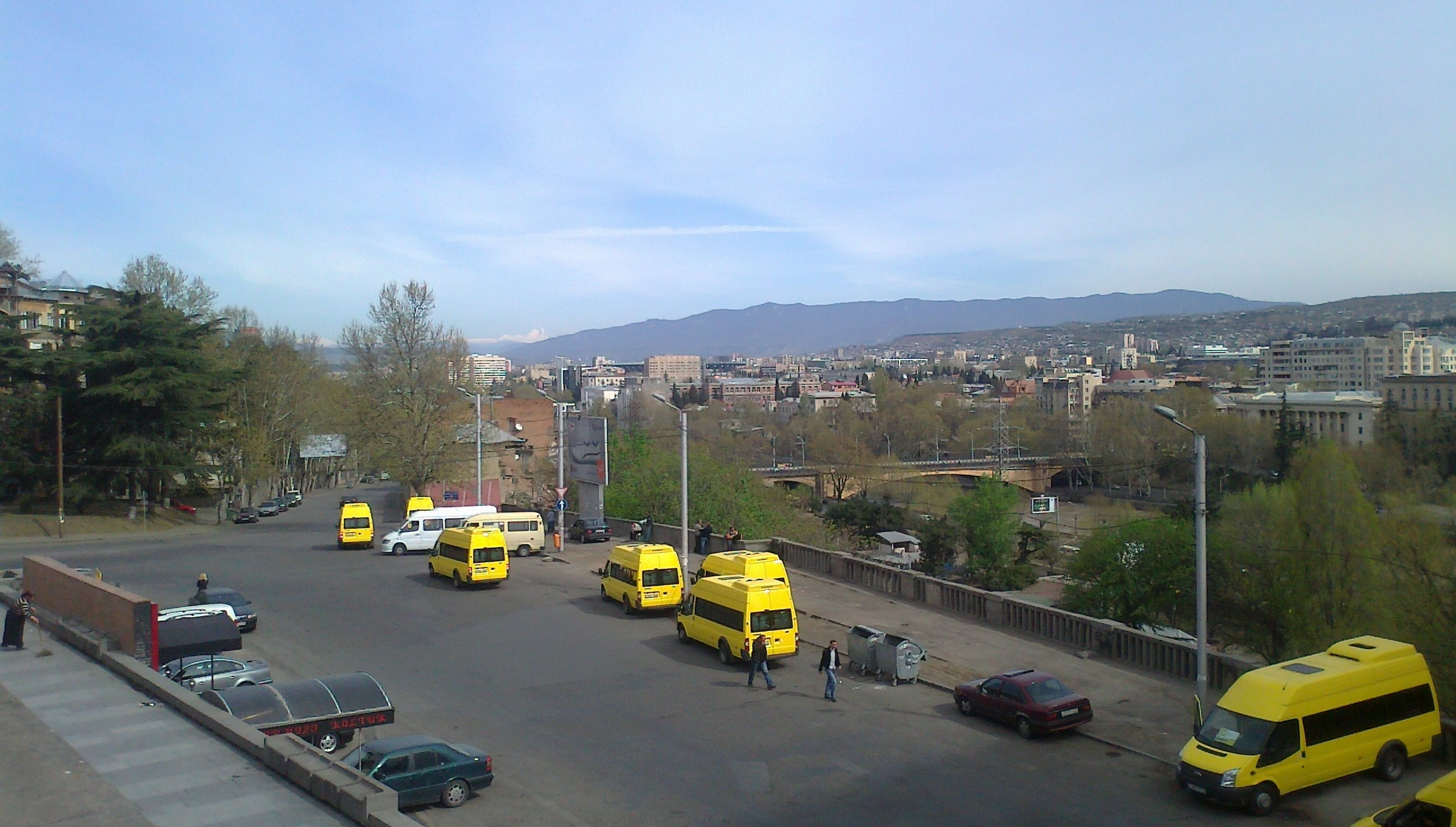
"Route taxi" minibuses in downtown Tbilisi in 2012

In Tbilisi, Georgia, marshrutkas ("მარშრუტკა" marshrutka; officially, "სამარშრუტო ტაქსი", samarshruto taksi, "route taxi") stop upon passengers' request at designated bus stops. In Marshrutkas, just as in buses, all cabs accept only digital payments, either from the Tbilisi MetroMoney card (pre-loaded city transportation card), the Travel Card, or any credit or debit card supporting NFC transactions.

== See also ==
- Share taxi
- Pesero
- Dollar van
- Dolmuş
- Minibuses in Hong Kong
- Nanny van
- Aluguer
- Hail and ride
- Songthaew
