= GAZ Group Bus Division =

- Industry: Automotive
- Founded: 7 August 2000; 26 years ago
- Parent: GAZ Group
- Website: bus.ru

GAZ Group Bus Division is the business unit of the GAZ Group overseeing bus manufacturing. It combines several Russian bus manufacturing companies.

Starting in 2015, the GAZ Group has introduced a single brand for all its bus manufacturing subsidiaries, and newly manufactured vehicles now feature the deer badge of the GAZ company.

== History ==
The division has its origins in a reorganization of the automotive companies owned by the Siberian Aluminum holding (later Basic Element), which were consolidated under the RusPromAvto consortium. RusPromAvto (Russian: РусПромАвто) was created on 7 August 2000 and combined several Russian bus manufacturers. LiAZ was added to the group in 2001.

It became known as Russian Buses (Russian: Компания Русские Автобусы, romanized: Kompaniya Russkiye Avtobusy) in May 2004, and was based in the village of Maliye Vyazemy in Moscow Oblast. In 2005, during the restructuring of the production assets of RusPromAvto, the company was incorporated into the GAZ Group.

== Structure ==
Companies of the division:

- Kurgan Bus Factory (KAvZ)
- Pavlovo Bus Factory (PAZ)
- Likinsky Bus Factory (LiAZ)

=== Former companies ===
- Golitsynsky Bus Factory, (GolAZ) brand was discontinued in 2014 and the factory now makes agricultural machines.
- Kanashsky Auto Aggregate Factory (Russian: Канашский автоагрегатный завод (КААЗ), romanized: Kanashskiy Avtoagregatny Zavod (KAAZ), bus chassis producers.
