= Pavlovo Bus Factory =

Manufacturer of buses in Russia

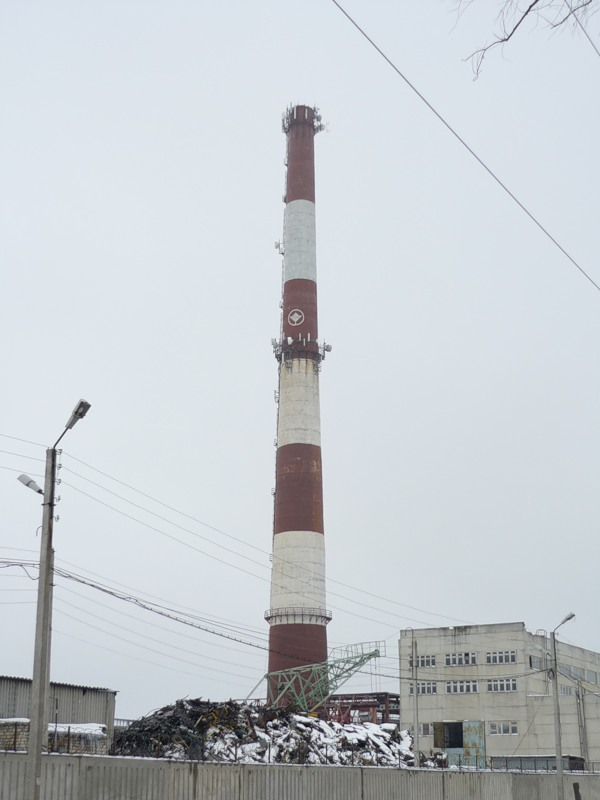
- Chimney of Pavlovo bus factory
- Type: Public company
- Traded as: MCX: PAZA
- Industry: Automotive, ISIC: 2910
- Founded: 1932
- Headquarters: Pavlovo, Nizhny Novgorod Oblast, Russia
- Key people: Andrei Vladimirovich Vasiliev
- Products: Buses
- Revenue: $256 million (2017)
- Operating income: $7.54 million (2017)
- Net income: $12.4 million (2017)
- Total assets: $339 million (2017)
- Total equity: $102 million (2017)
- Parent: GAZ Group Bus Division
- Website: www.paz-bus.ru

Former company brand

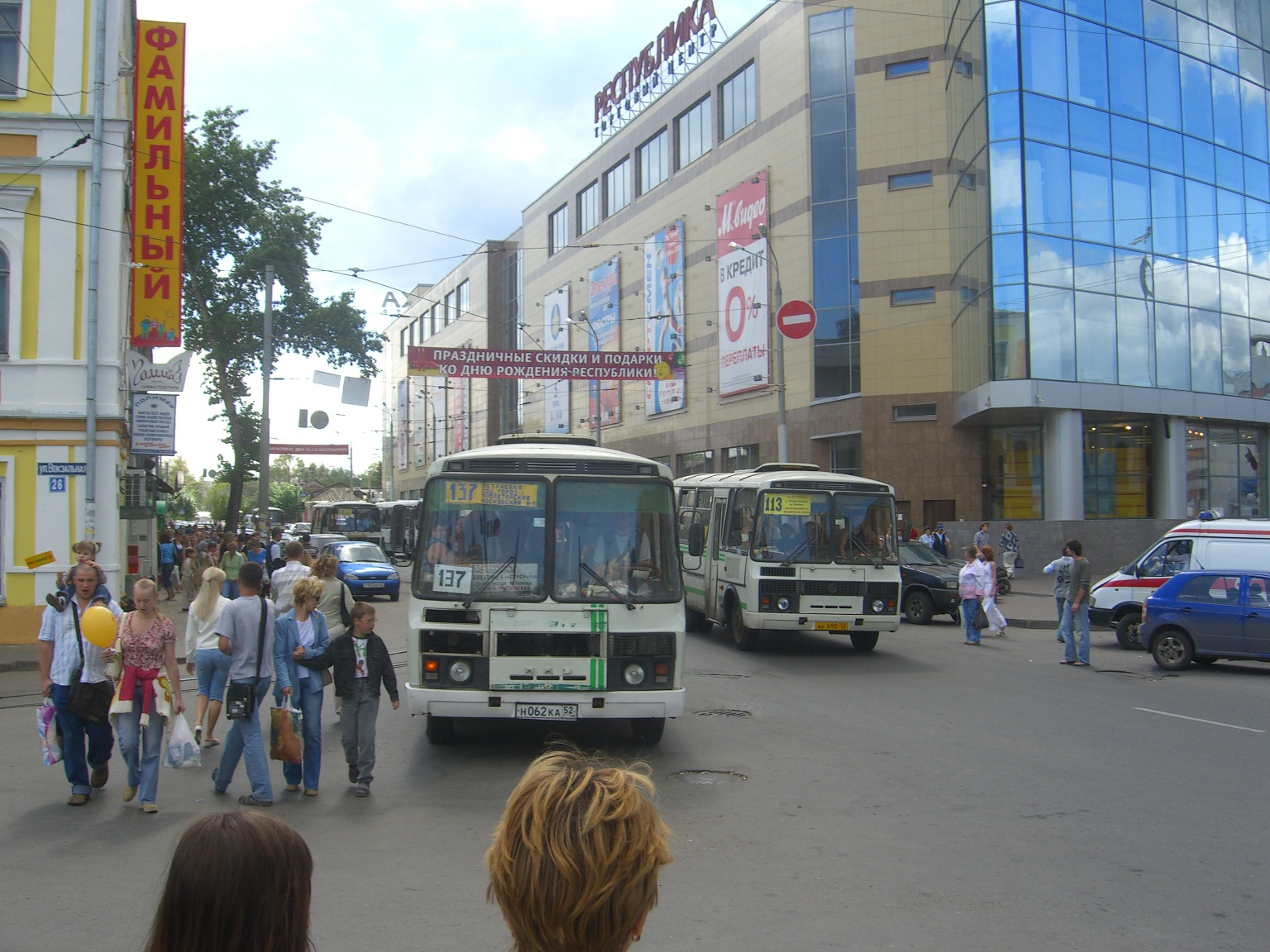
PAZ buses are the workhorses of public transportation in Nizhny Novgorod

Pavlovo Bus Factory (Russian: Павловский автобус, formerly Па́вловский авто́бусный заво́д, Pavlovsky Avtobusny Zavod or PAZ) is a manufacturer of buses in Russia, in the city of Pavlovo, Nizhny Novgorod Oblast. PAZ is a subsidiary of Russian Buses which is a division of GAZ. The production of buses since 2005 has been carried out by PAZ, a 100% subsidiary of PAO Pavlovsky Avtobus.

Pavlovo Bus Factory specializes in designing and manufacturing buses of the small/medium class (length 9.7 m). Buses are the most common plant in Russia, their annual output is over 10,000 units, almost 80% of small buses in Russia. The small PAZ buses have long been used by Russian "fixed-route taxi" (marshrutka) operators.

Starting in 2015, the GAZ Group introduced a single brand for all its bus manufacturing subsidiaries, and newly manufactured vehicles now feature the deer badge of the GAZ company.

== History ==
The factory has its origins in the ZATI automobile and tractor tool plant, established in Pavlovo in 1932. The building of the factory started in 1952, and in the same year the first PAZ-651 long-hood buses (based on the GAZ-51 general-purpose lorry) were produced. The government had a plan to produce 10,000 buses per year. In 1960, the production of new PAZ-652 forward control model on the same chassis started. It was replaced by the outwardly similar PAZ-672 (based on the GAZ-53 lorry) in early 1968, and this bus had a large family of various modifications. 1989 saw a start of production of the new PAZ-3205 model having basically the same chassis but a completely new body.

== Models ==
=== Current ===
- PAZ-3205 (1989–present)
- PAZ-3206 (1995–present)
- PAZ-3237 "Luzhok" (2002–present)
- PAZ-4234 (2003–present)
- PAZ-3203 (2006–present)
- PAZ-3204 (2006–present)
- PAZ Vector 4 (2012–present)
- PAZ Vector 3 (2015–present)
- GAZ Vector Next (2016–present)

=== Former ===
- PAZ-651 (1950-1961, based on GAZ-51I)
  - PAZ-651A (1961-1971)
- PAZ-652 (1958-1968)
- PAZ-653 (1950–1956, ambulance version of PAZ-651)
- PAZ-655 (1954–?, armored van version of PAZ-651)
- PAZ-657 (1954–1958, bread van version of PAZ-651)
- PAZ-661 (1954–1956, clothing van version of PAZ-651)
  - PAZ-661B
- PAZ-672 (1967-1989)
- PAZ-3201 (1972-1989, based on GAZ-66)
- PAZ-5272 (1999-2003)
- PAZ-4230 Aurora (2001-2002, production moved to KAvZ)
- PAZ-4238 Aurora (2001-2002, production moved to KAvZ)
- PAZ Real (2007-2009)

=== Panel vans ===
- PAZ-657 (1954–1958, based on GAZ-51)
- PAZ-659

=== Trailers ===
- PAZ-658
- PAZ-740
- PAZ-742
- PAZ-743
- PAZ-744
- PAZ-746
- PAZ-750

=== Prototypes ===
- PAZ-665 (1964)
- PAZ-671 (1958, based on GAZ-52)
  - PAZ-671A (1958, based on GAZ-53)
  - PAZ-671G (based on GAZ-52A)
- PAZ-675 (1960, based on GAZ-52)
- PAZ-985 (1960)
- PAZ-3202 (1973)
- PAZ-3203 (1972)
- PAZ-3204 (1974)

== Around the world ==
- One PAZ-672 came to Chile between 1970 and 1971 with the installation of the soviet KPD factory of concrete blocks for prefabricated buildings, in Quilpué . This was one of the many symbols of the relation between the Soviet Union and the Unidad Popular government in Chile.

== Gallery ==
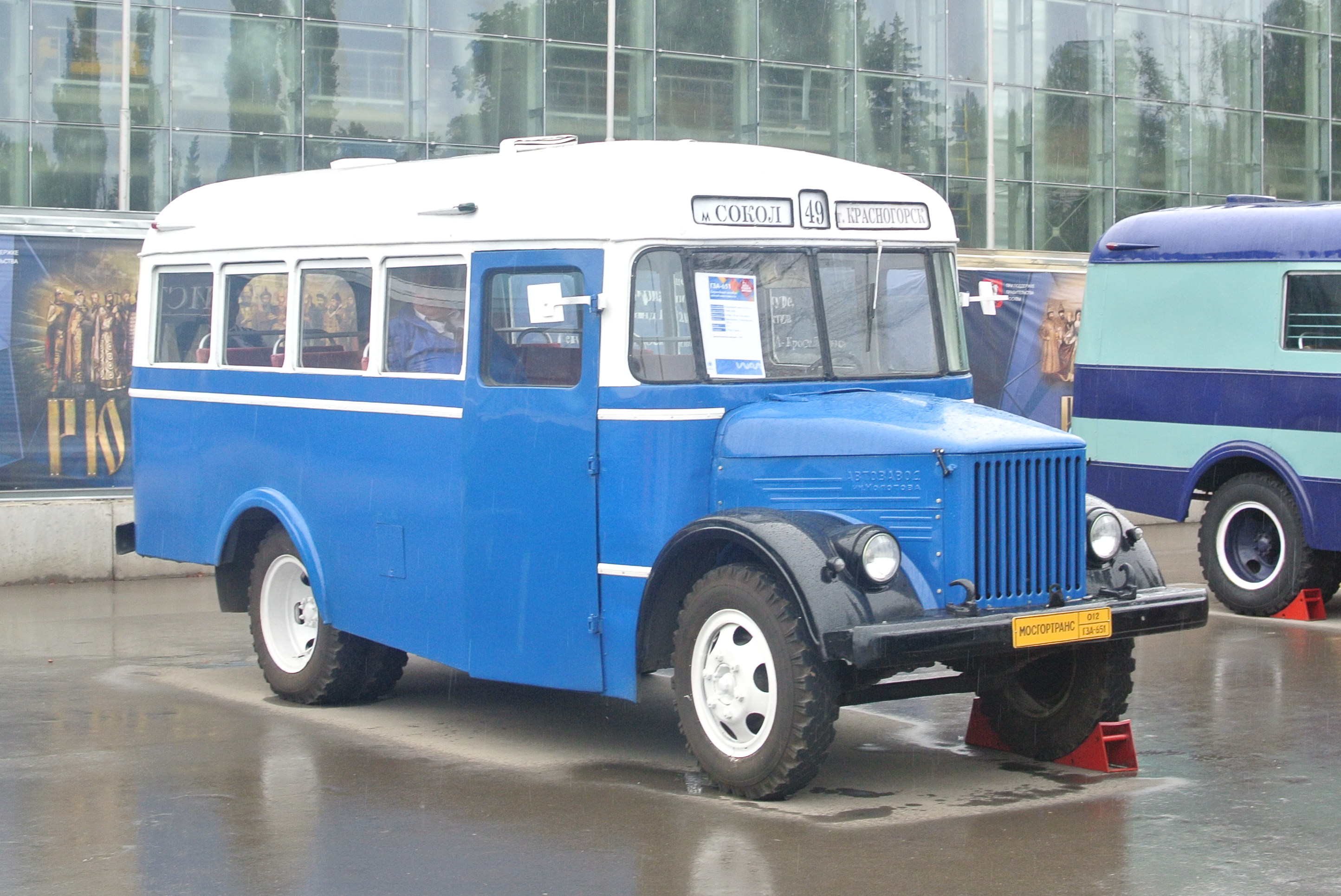
PAZ-651

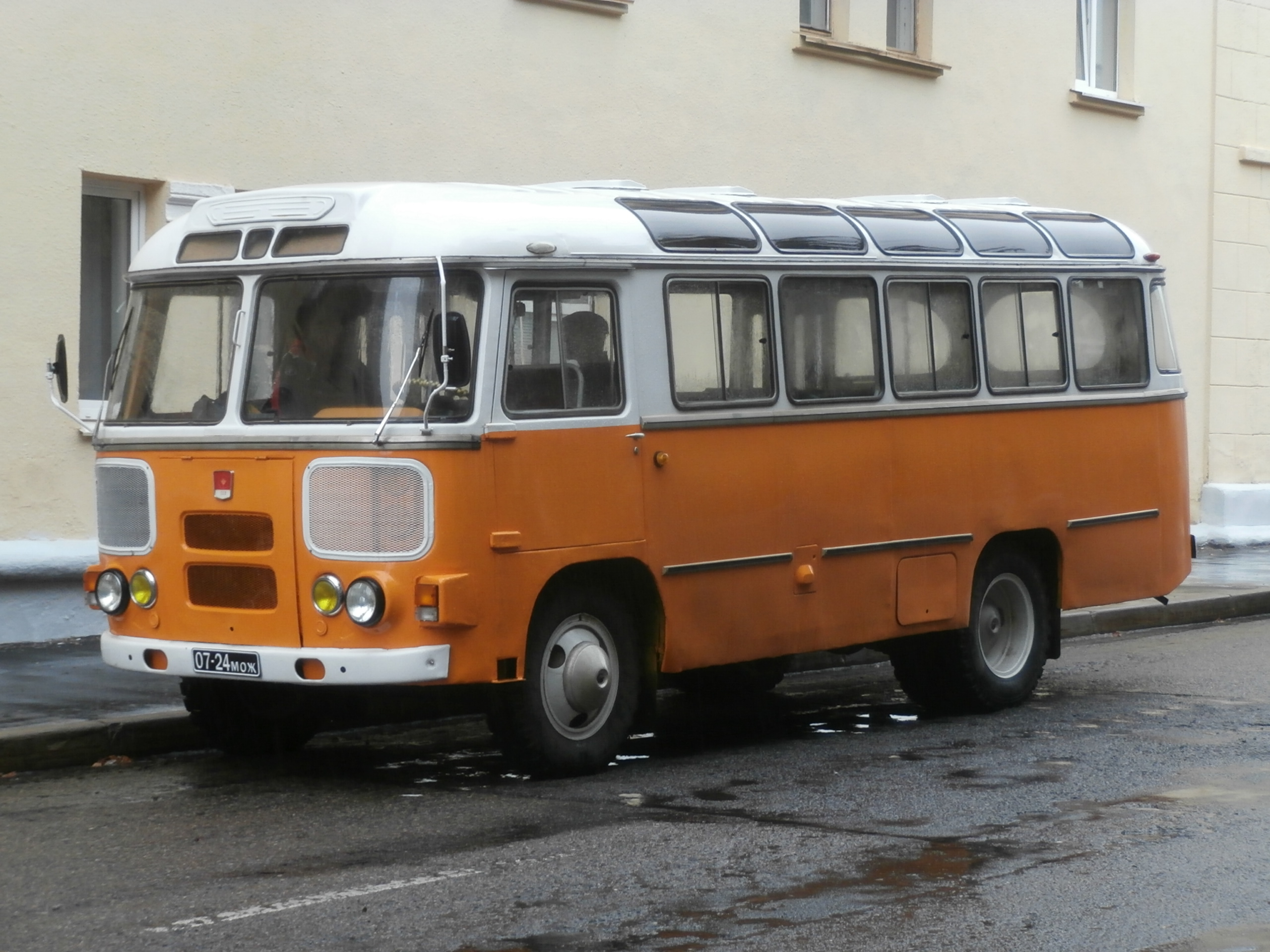
PAZ-672

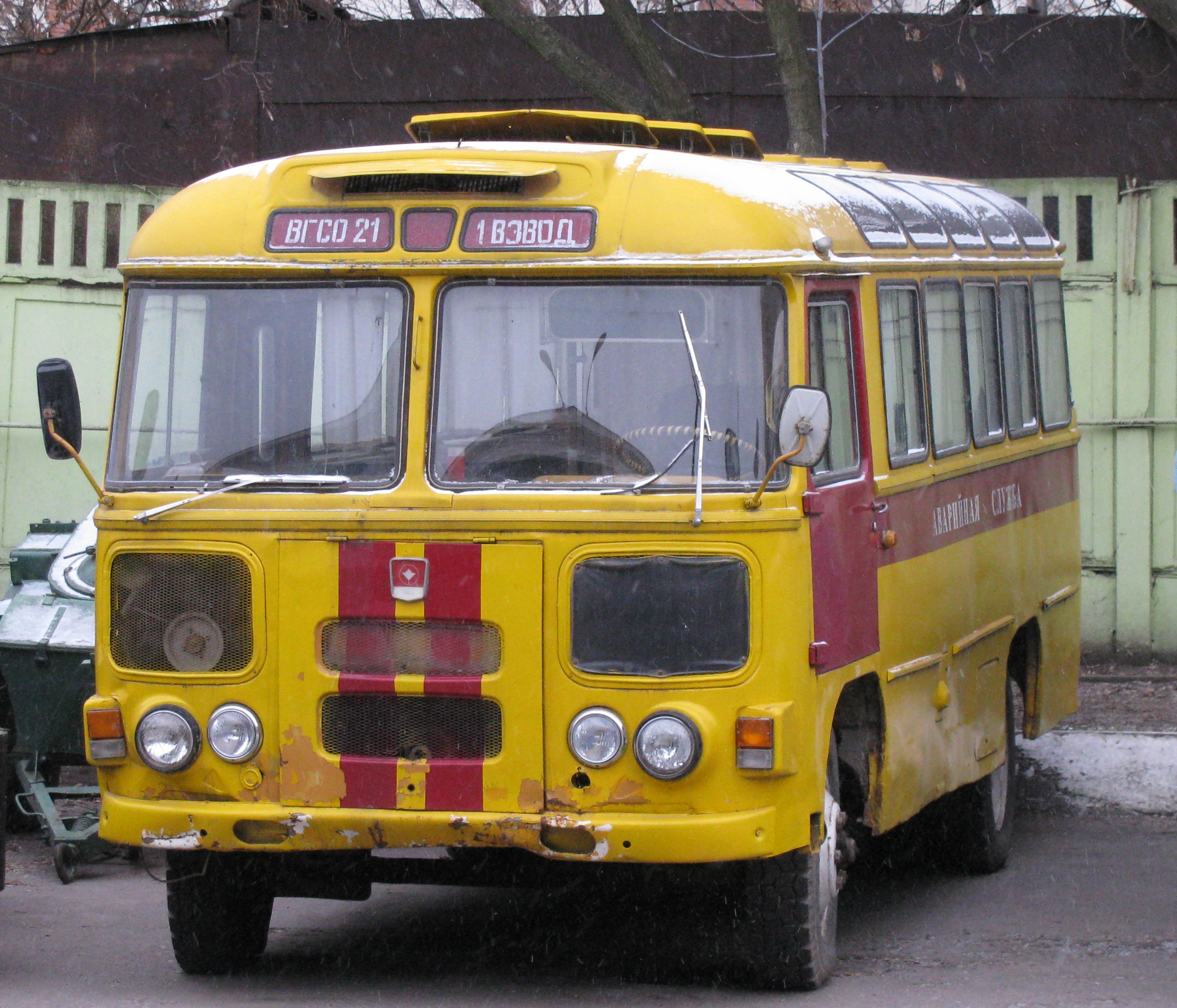
PAZ-672 Emergency Gas Service Command Bus in Moscow

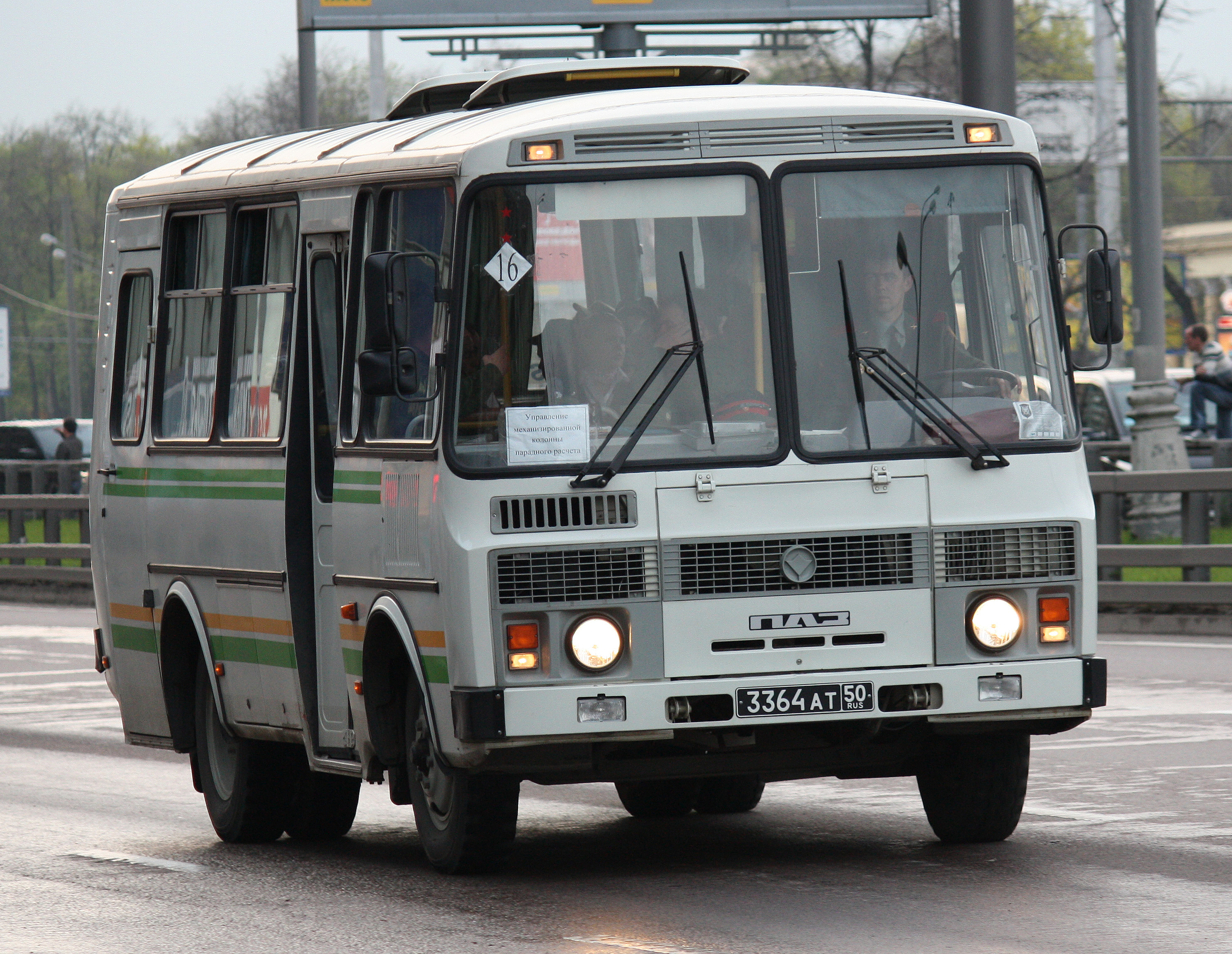
PAZ-3205

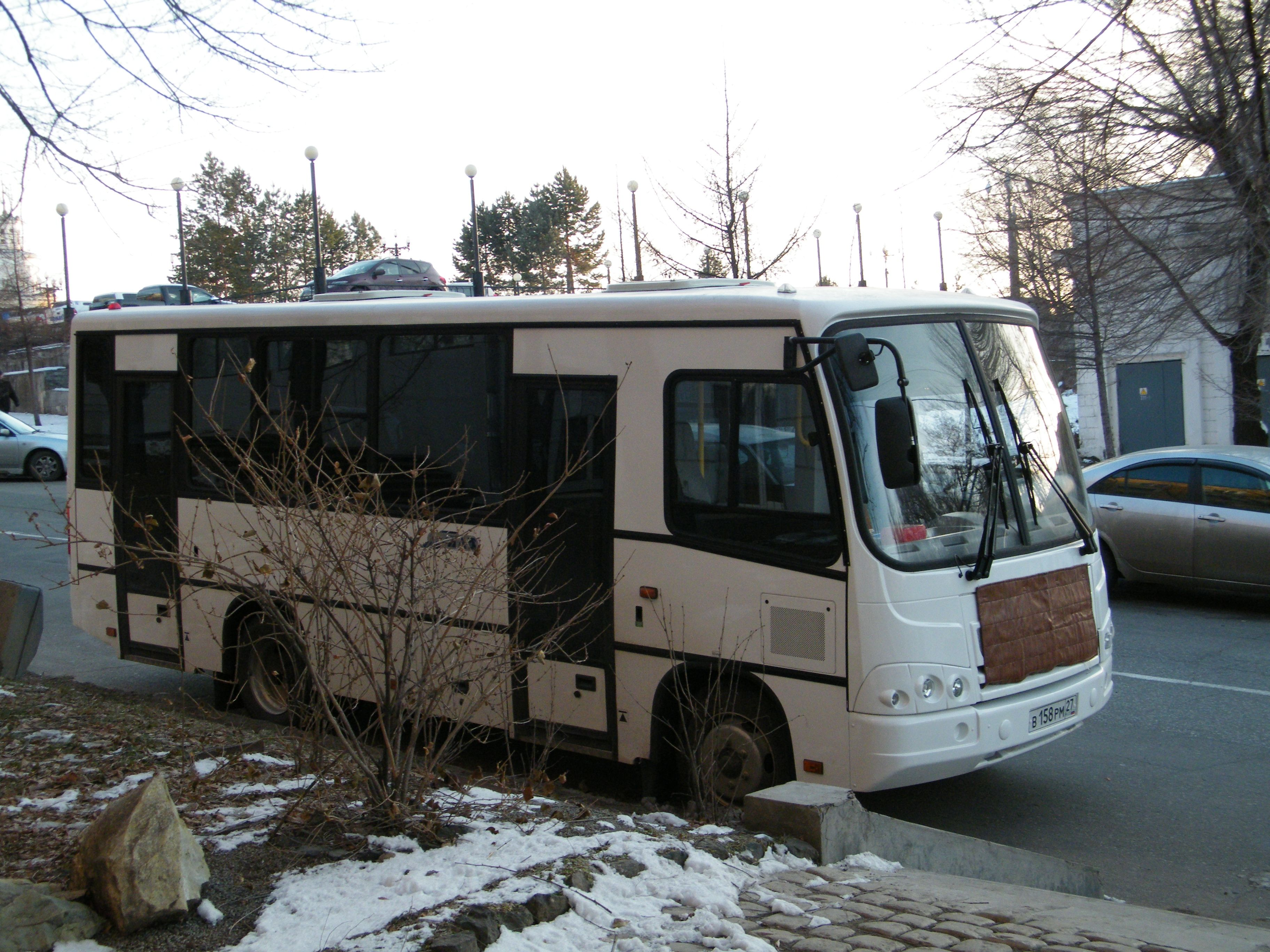
PAZ-3204

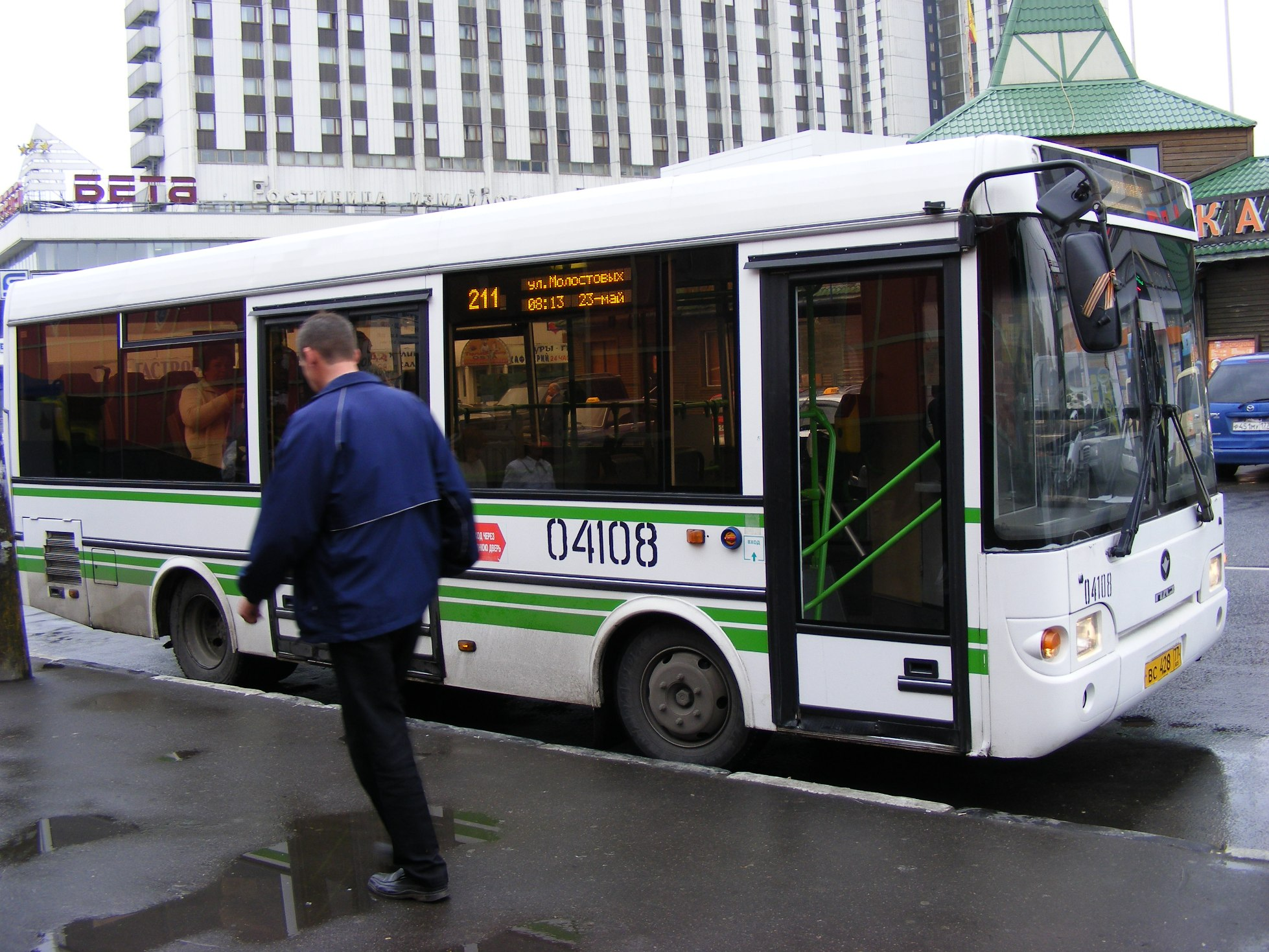
PAZ-3237 in Moscow

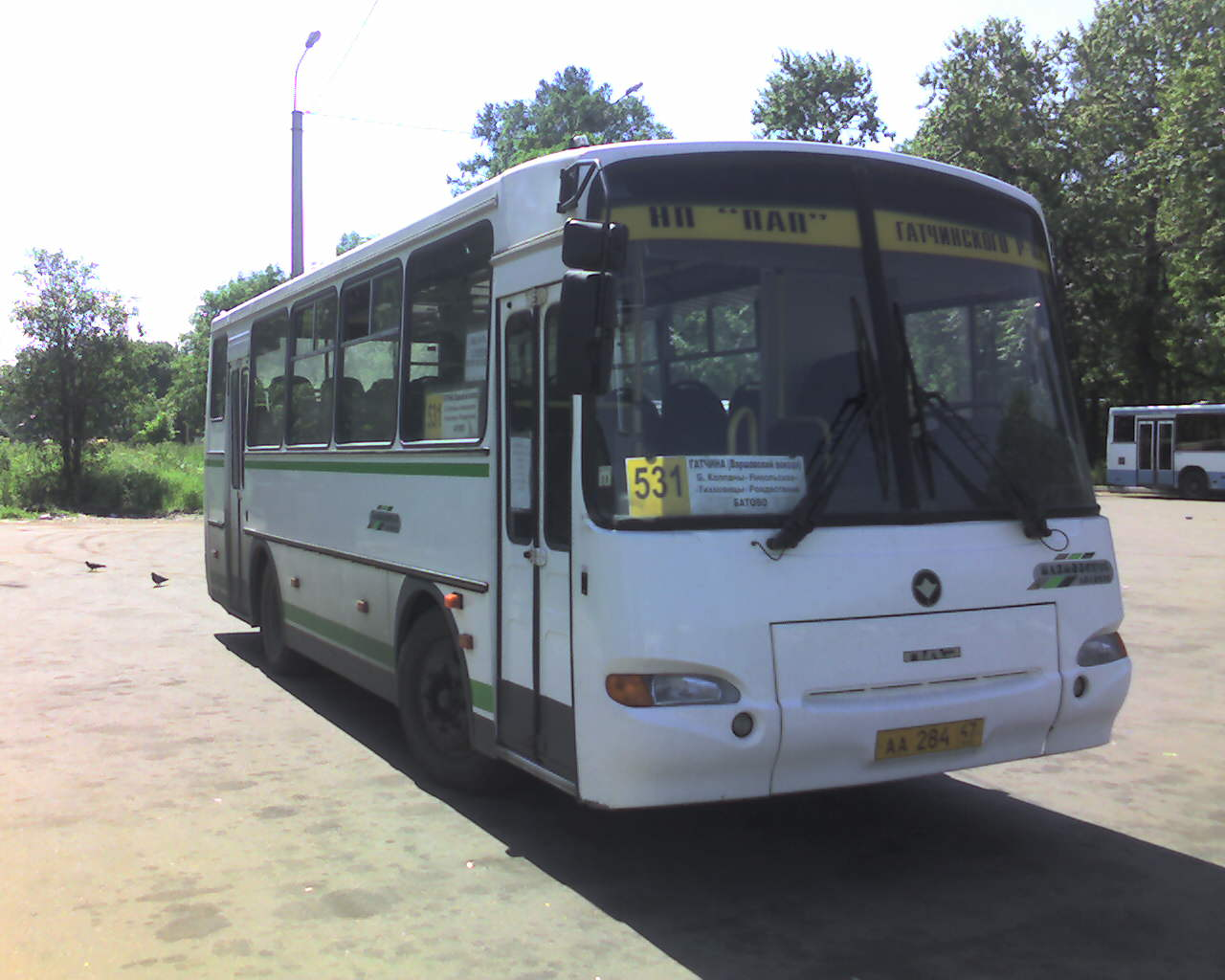
PAZ-4230 "Aurora" in Gatchina

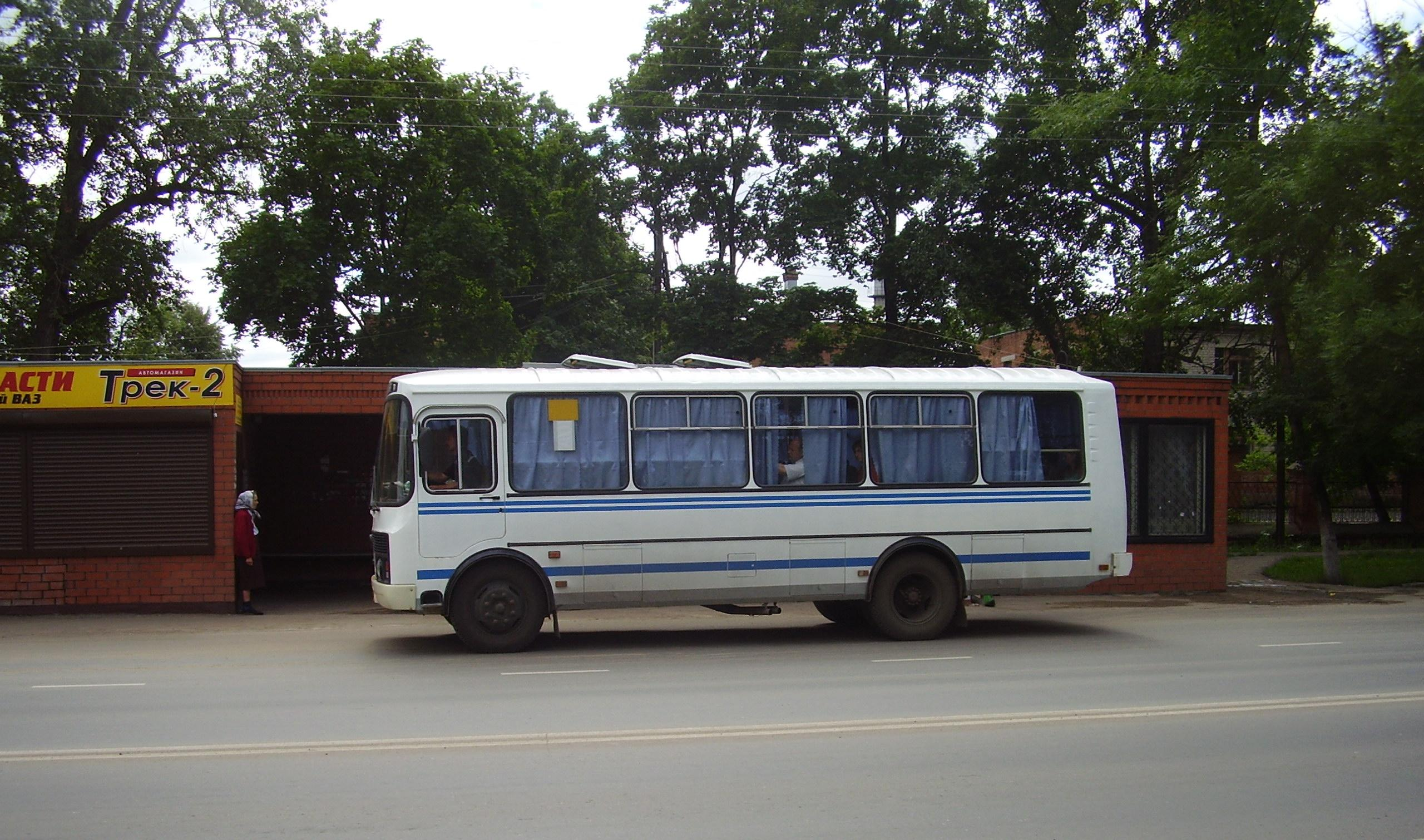
PAZ-4234

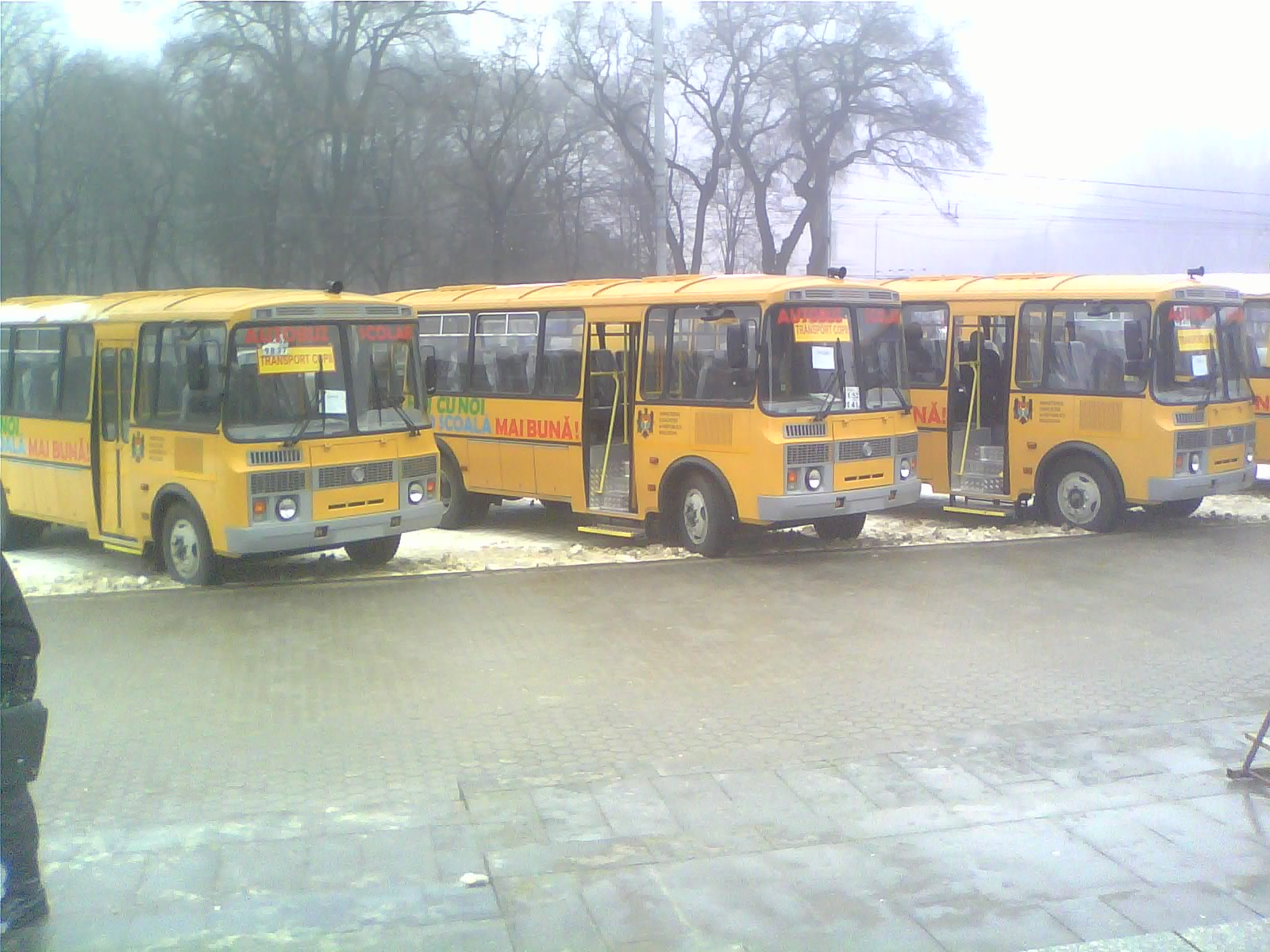
A row of new PAZ school buses in the central square of Chisinau, Moldova

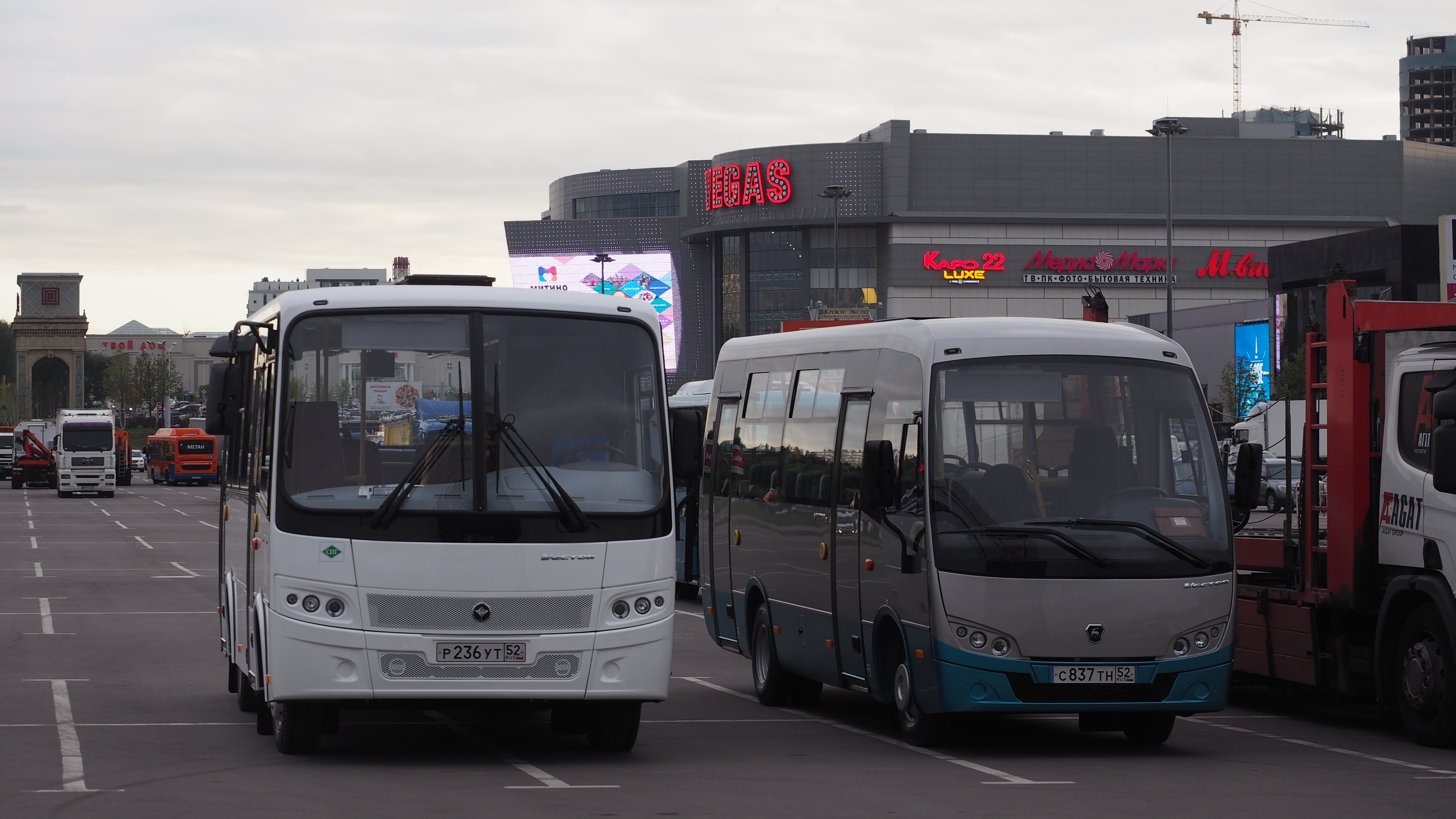
PAZ Vector 3 (right) and Vector 4 (left)
