= KAvZ =

Russian bus manufacturer

- Native name: ООО «Курганский автобусный завод»
- Formerly: Курганский автобусный завод им. 60-летия Союза ССР
- Company type: Private limited company
- Industry: Mechanical engineering
- Founded: 1958
- Headquarters: Kurgan, KGN, Russia
- Key people: Alexander Viktorovich Alsarayev, acting managing director
- Products: Middle range buses
- Services: Bus manufacturing
- Number of employees: circa 600 (2013)
- Parent: GAZ Group Bus Division
- Website: bus.ru

KAvZ (Russian: Курганский автобусный завод (КАвЗ), romanized: Kurgansky Avtobusny Zavod, lit. 'Kurgan Bus Plant') is a bus manufacturer in Kurgan, KGN, Russia. The factory started producing buses in 1958, based on trucks from GAZ. During the 1990s, it assembled Ikarus buses for the Russian market. Now a subsidiary of GAZ, it specialises in producing small buses, in particular school buses.

KAvZ is a subsidiary of Russian Buses which is a subsidiary of GAZ Group. Starting in 2015, the GAZ Group has introduced a single brand for all its bus manufacturing subsidiaries, and newly manufactured vehicles now feature the deer badge of the GAZ company.

== Models ==
Former company brand

=== Current ===
- KAvZ-4238 Aurora (2006–present)
- KAvZ-4235 Aurora (2008–present)
- KAvZ-4270 (2016–present)

=== Former ===
- KAvZ-651 (1958–1973)
- KAvZ-663 (1961–1966)
- KAvZ-685/3270/3271 (1971–1991)
- KAvZ-3100 (1976)
- KAvZ-49471 (1981–1985) -truckbus
- KAvZ-4959 (1985) -truckbus
- KAvZ-3275 (1991–1998)
- KAvZ-3976 (1993–2007)
- KAvZ-4229 (1998)
- KAvZ-4224 (1998–2003) -truckbus
- KAvZ-3244 (1998–2007)
- KAvZ-39766 (2002–2008)
- KAvZ-4239 (2008–2014)
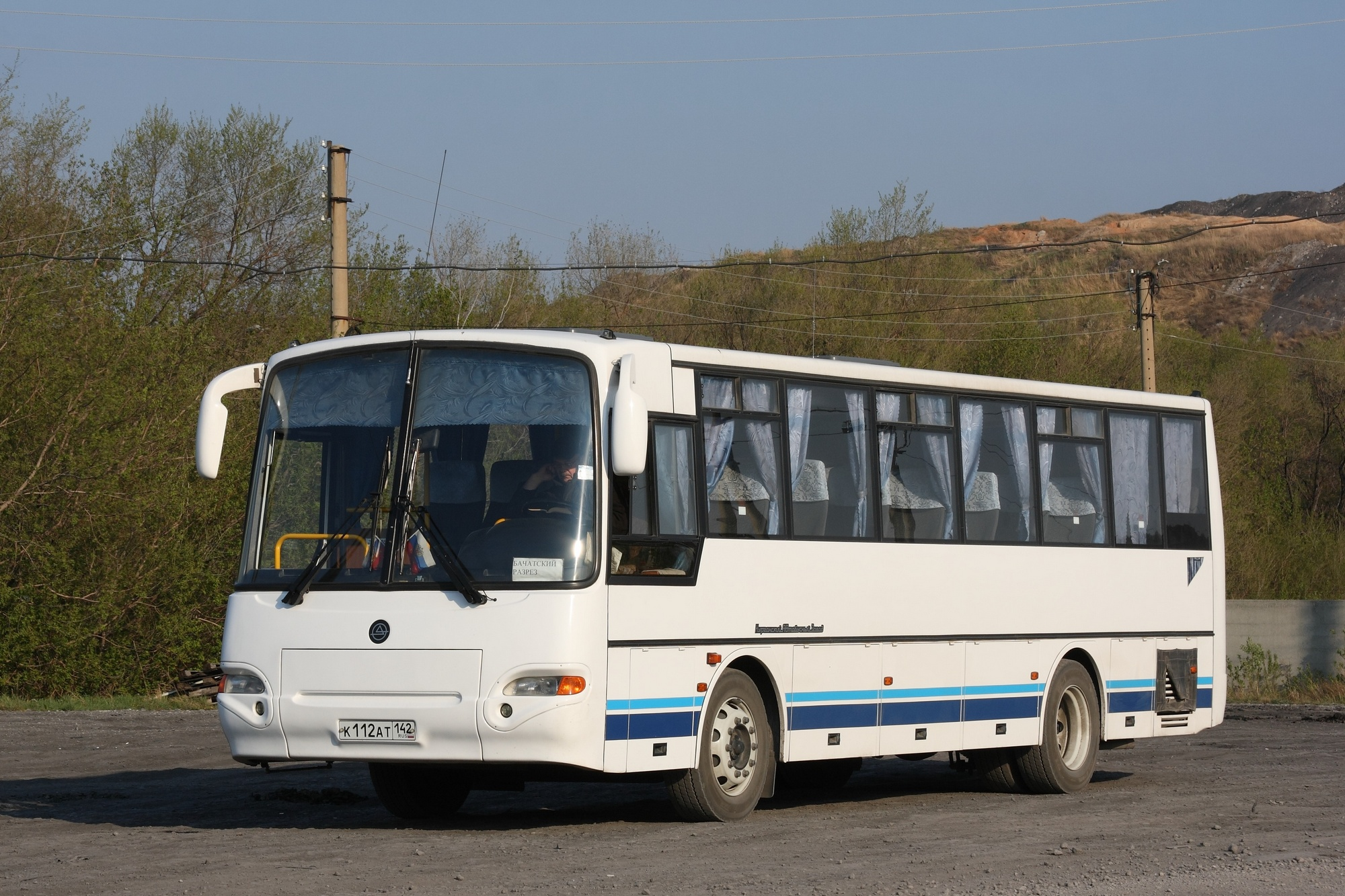
KAvZ-4238

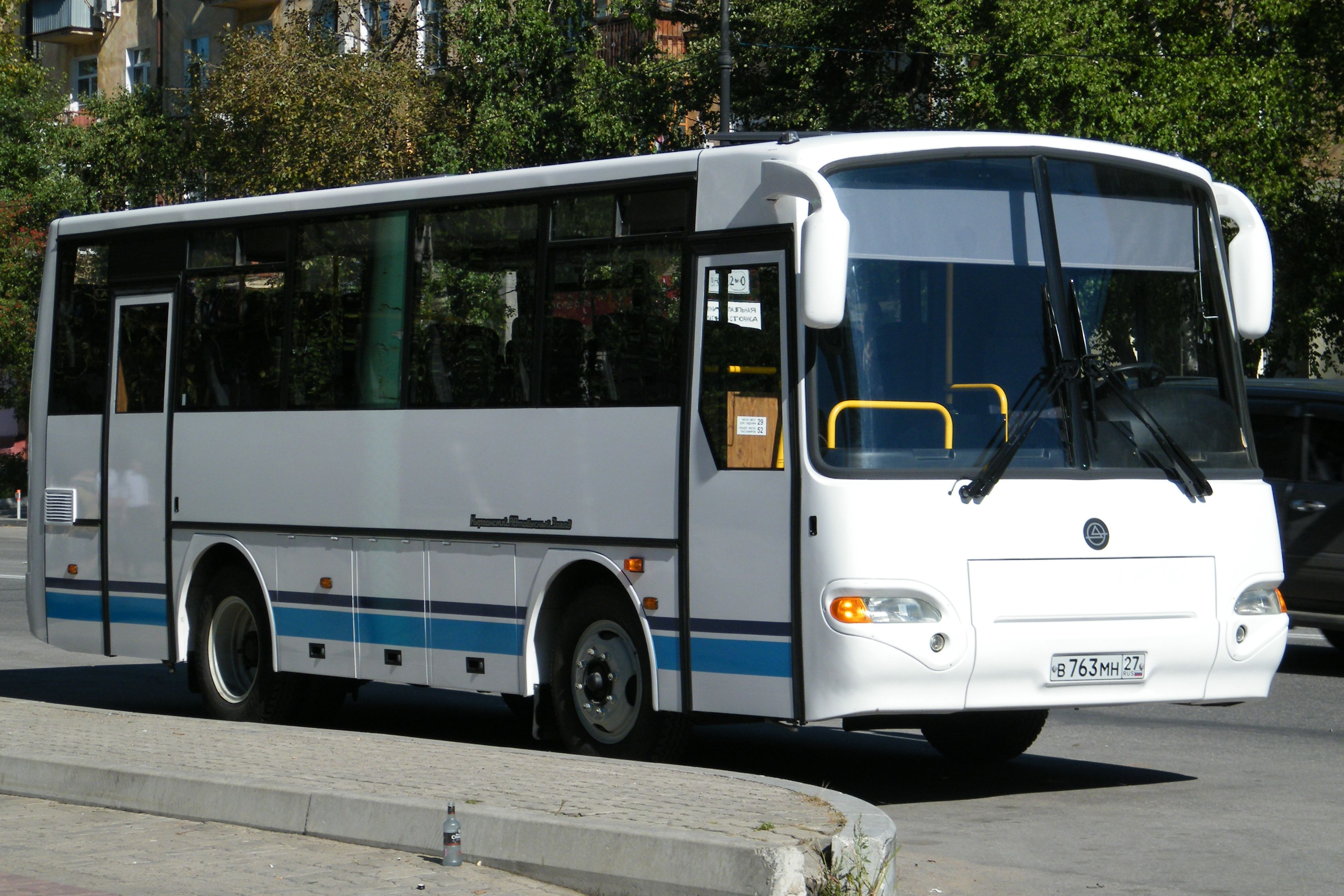
KAvZ-4235

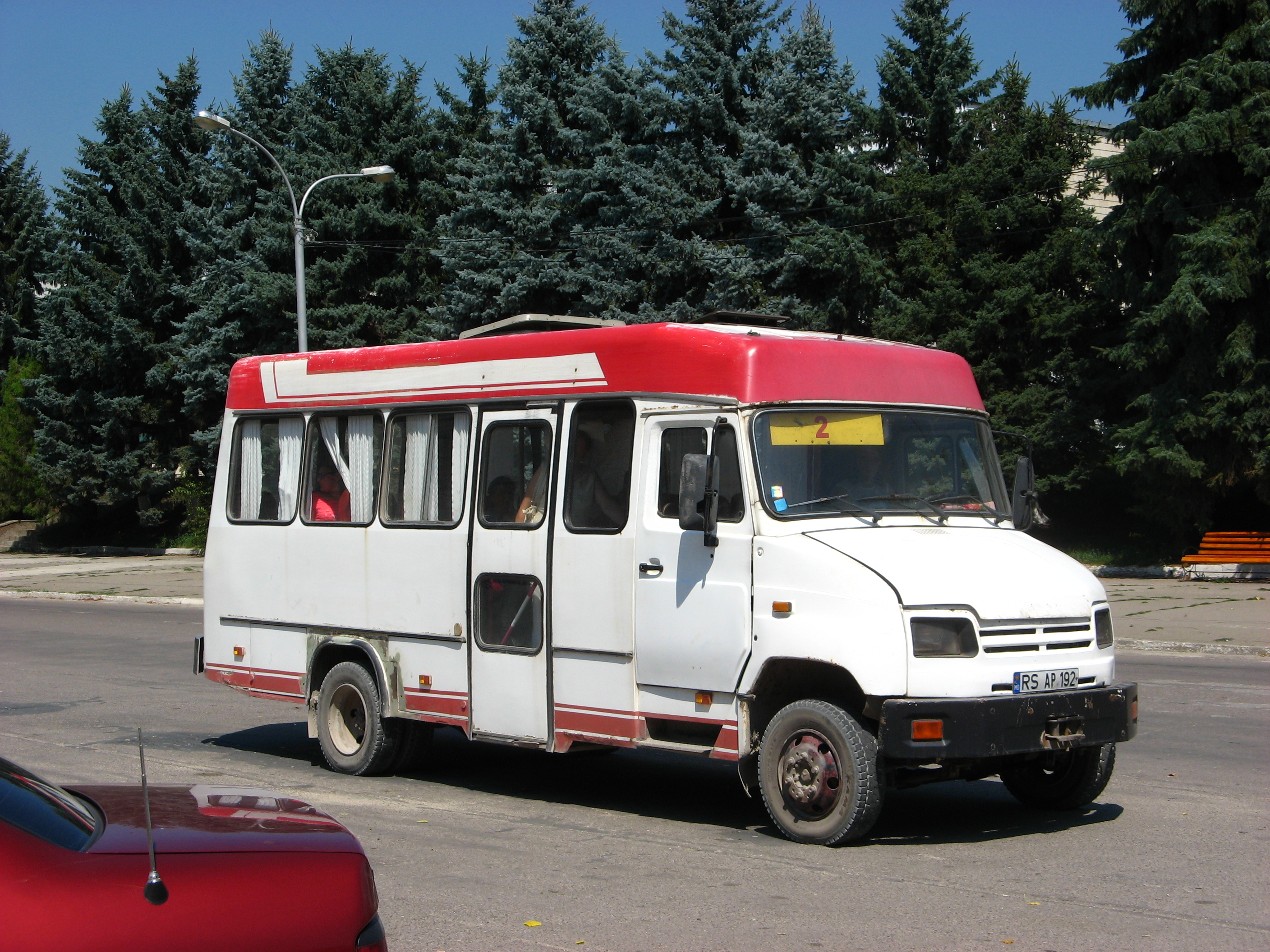
KAvZ-3244

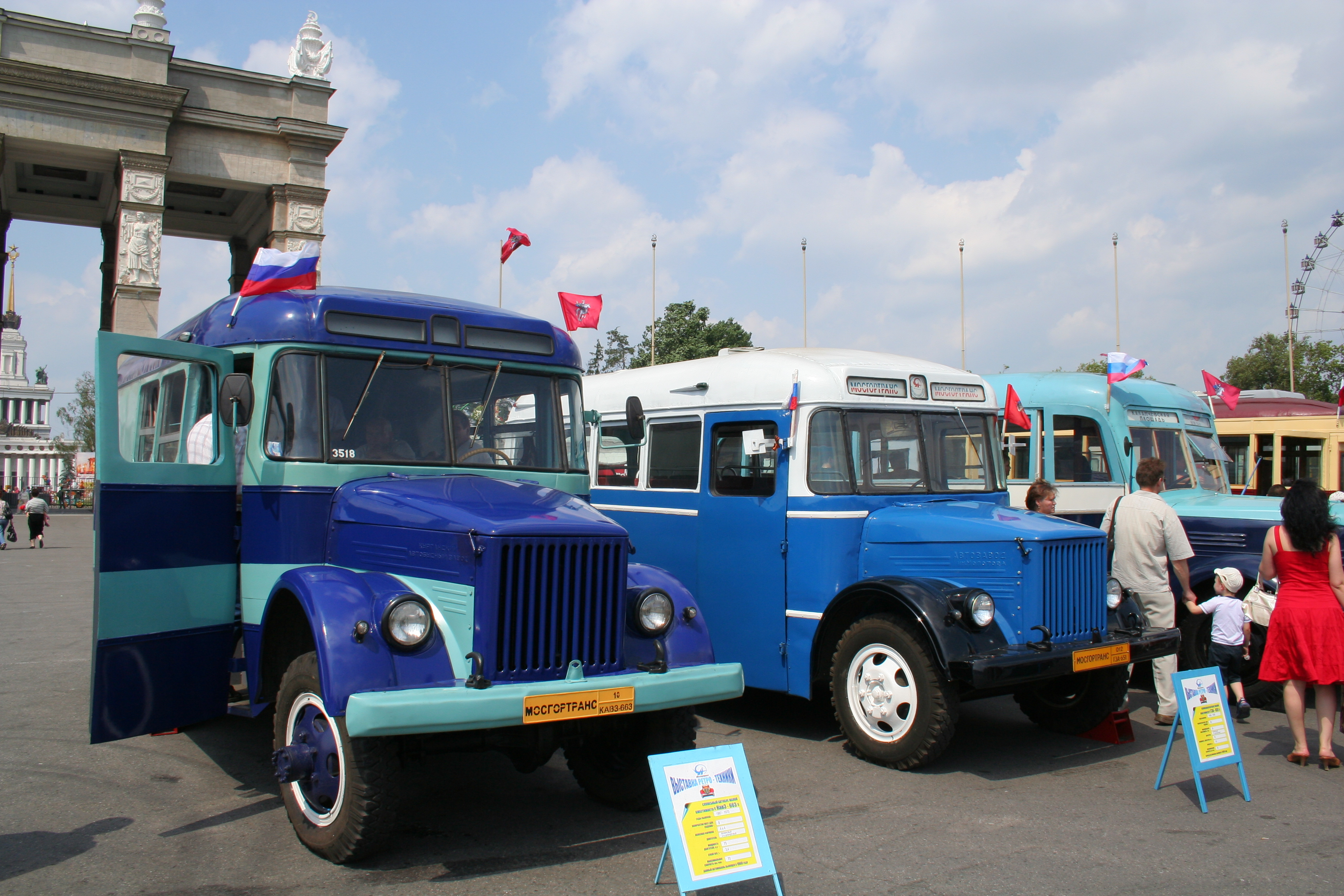
KAvZ-663 and a GZA-651 in the background (later produced as KAvZ-651)
