= Korovino (rural locality) =

Korovino (Russian: Коро́вино) is the name of several rural localities in Russia.

== Belgorod Oblast ==
As of 2010, three rural localities in Belgorod Oblast bear this name:

- Korovino, Rakityansky District, Belgorod Oblast, a selo in Dmitriyevsky Rural Okrug of Rakityansky District
- Korovino, Shebekinsky District, Belgorod Oblast, a selo in Shebekinsky District
- Korovino, Volokonovsky District, Belgorod Oblast, a selo in Staroivanovsky Rural Okrug of Volokonovsky District

== Chuvash Republic ==
As of 2010, one rural locality in the Chuvash Republic bears this name:

- Korovino, Chuvash Republic, a village in Anastasovskoye Rural Settlement of Poretsky District

== Ivanovo Oblast ==
As of 2010, three rural localities in Ivanovo Oblast bear this name:

- Korovino, Privolzhsky District, Ivanovo Oblast, a village in Privolzhsky District
- Korovino, Shuysky District, Ivanovo Oblast, a village in Shuysky District
- Korovino, Zavolzhsky District, Ivanovo Oblast, a village in Zavolzhsky District

== Kaluga Oblast ==
As of 2010, one rural locality in Kaluga Oblast bears this name:

- Korovino, Kaluga Oblast, a village in Meshchovsky District

== Kirov Oblast ==
As of 2010, two rural localities in Kirov Oblast bear this name:

- Korovino, Pizhansky District, Kirov Oblast, a village in Izhevsky Rural Okrug of Pizhansky District
- Korovino, Podosinovsky District, Kirov Oblast, a village in Yakhrengsky Rural Okrug of Podosinovsky District

== Kostroma Oblast ==
As of 2010, one rural locality in Kostroma Oblast bears this name:

- Korovino, Kostroma Oblast, a village in Podvigalikhinskoye Settlement of Manturovsky District

== Kursk Oblast ==
As of 2010, one rural locality in Kursk Oblast bears this name:

- Korovino, Kursk Oblast, a village in Gorodnovsky Selsoviet of Zheleznogorsky District

== Moscow Oblast ==
As of 2010, five rural localities in Moscow Oblast bear this name:

- Korovino, Chekhovsky District, Moscow Oblast, a village in Stremilovskoye Rural Settlement of Chekhovsky District
- Korovino, Mozhaysky District, Moscow Oblast, a village in Borisovskoye Rural Settlement of Mozhaysky District, Moscow Oblast
- Korovino, Naro-Fominsky District, Moscow Oblast, a village in Volchenkovskoye Rural Settlement of Naro-Fominsky District
- Korovino, Orekhovo-Zuyevsky District, Moscow Oblast, a village in Gorskoye Rural Settlement of Orekhovo-Zuyevsky District
- Korovino, Serebryano-Prudsky District, Moscow Oblast, a village in Uzunovskoye Rural Settlement of Serebryano-Prudsky District

== Nizhny Novgorod Oblast ==
As of 2010, five rural localities in Nizhny Novgorod Oblast bear this name:

- Korovino, Bor, Nizhny Novgorod Oblast, a village in Lindovsky Selsoviet of the city of oblast significance of Bor
- Korovino, Gorodetsky District, Nizhny Novgorod Oblast, a village in Smirkinsky Selsoviet of Gorodetsky District
- Korovino, Kstovsky District, Nizhny Novgorod Oblast, a village in Chernyshikhinsky Selsoviet of Kstovsky District
- Korovino, Pavlovsky District, Nizhny Novgorod Oblast, a village in Korovinsky Selsoviet of Pavlovsky District
- Korovino, Sokolsky District, Nizhny Novgorod Oblast, a village in Loyminsky Selsoviet of Sokolsky District

== Novgorod Oblast ==
As of 2010, one rural locality in Novgorod Oblast bears this name:

- Korovino, Novgorod Oblast, a village in Laptevskoye Settlement of Pestovsky District

== Orenburg Oblast ==
As of 2010, one rural locality in Orenburg Oblast bears this name:

- Korovino, Orenburg Oblast, a selo in Korovinsky Selsoviet of Buguruslansky District

== Perm Krai ==
As of 2010, two rural localities in Perm Krai bear this name:

- Korovino, Dobryanka, Perm Krai, a village under the administrative jurisdiction of the city of krai significance of Dobryanka
- Korovino, Kuyedinsky District, Perm Krai, a village in Kuyedinsky District

== Smolensk Oblast ==
As of 2010, one rural locality in Smolensk Oblast bears this name:

- Korovino, Smolensk Oblast, a village in Slobodskoye Rural Settlement of Monastyrshchinsky District

== Tambov Oblast ==
As of 2010, two rural localities in Tambov Oblast bear this name:

- Korovino, Bondarsky District, Tambov Oblast, a selo in Mitropolsky Selsoviet of Bondarsky District
- Korovino, Znamensky District, Tambov Oblast, a settlement in Pokrovo-Marfinsky Selsoviet of Znamensky District

== Tver Oblast ==
As of 2010, five rural localities in Tver Oblast bear this name:

- Korovino, Belsky District, Tver Oblast, a village in Belsky District
- Korovino (Dmitrovogorskoye Rural Settlement), Konakovsky District, Tver Oblast, a village in Konakovsky District; municipally, a part of Dmitrovogorskoye Rural Settlement of that district
- Korovino (Yuryevo-Devichyevskoye Rural Settlement), Konakovsky District, Tver Oblast, a village in Konakovsky District; municipally, a part of Yuryevo-Devichyevskoye Rural Settlement of that district
- Korovino, Rameshkovsky District, Tver Oblast, a village in Rameshkovsky District
- Korovino, Zharkovsky District, Tver Oblast, a village in Zharkovsky District

== Udmurt Republic ==
As of 2010, one rural locality in the Udmurt Republic bears this name:

- Korovino, Udmurt Republic, a village in Serginsky Selsoviet of Balezinsky District

== Ulyanovsk Oblast ==
As of 2010, one rural locality in Ulyanovsk Oblast bears this name:

- Korovino, Ulyanovsk Oblast, a selo in Kalmayursky Rural Okrug of Cherdaklinsky District

== Vladimir Oblast ==
As of 2010, three rural localities in Vladimir Oblast bear this name:

- Korovino, Alexandrovsky District, Vladimir Oblast, a village in Alexandrovsky District
- Korovino, Melenkovsky District, Vladimir Oblast, a selo in Melenkovsky District
- Korovino, Vyaznikovsky District, Vladimir Oblast, a village in Vyaznikovsky District

== Vologda Oblast ==
As of 2010, four rural localities in Vologda Oblast bear this name:

- Korovino, Belozersky District, Vologda Oblast, a village in Bechevinsky Selsoviet of Belozersky District
- Korovino, Ust-Kubinsky District, Vologda Oblast, a village in Ustyansky Selsoviet of Ust-Kubinsky District
- Korovino, Vashkinsky District, Vologda Oblast, a village in Vasilyevsky Selsoviet of Vashkinsky District
- Korovino, Verkhovazhsky District, Vologda Oblast, a village in Termengsky Selsoviet of Verkhovazhsky District

== Yaroslavl Oblast ==
As of 2010, six rural localities in Yaroslavl Oblast bear this name:

- Korovino, Seredskoy Rural Okrug, Danilovsky District, Yaroslavl Oblast, a village in Seredskoy Rural Okrug of Danilovsky District
- Korovino, Zimenkovsky Rural Okrug, Danilovsky District, Yaroslavl Oblast, a village in Zimenkovsky Rural Okrug of Danilovsky District
- Korovino, Myshkinsky District, Yaroslavl Oblast, a village in Okhotinsky Rural Okrug of Myshkinsky District
- Korovino, Pereslavsky District, Yaroslavl Oblast, a village in Dobrilovsky Rural Okrug of Pereslavsky District
- Korovino, Pervomaysky District, Yaroslavl Oblast, a village in Semenovsky Rural Okrug of Pervomaysky District
- Korovino, Poshekhonsky District, Yaroslavl Oblast, a village in Beloselsky Rural Okrug of Poshekhonsky District
