= Korovino =

Korovino may refer to:

- Korovino, Moscow, a historical area in Moscow, Russia
- Korovino (rural locality), name of several rural localities in Russia
