= Transport in Russia =

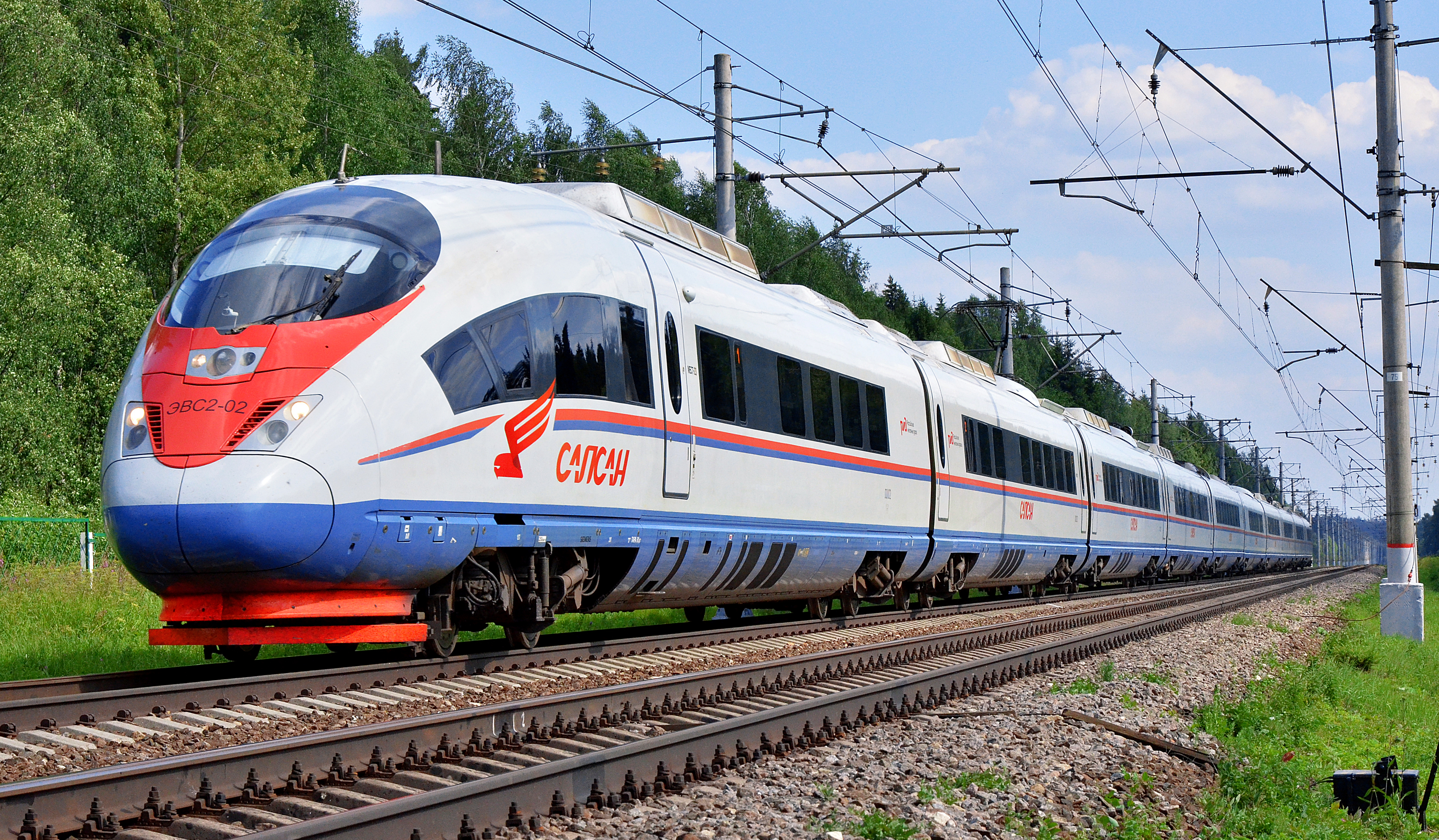
A Russian Railways Siemens Velaro Sapsan train

The transport network of the Russian Federation is one of the world's most extensive transport networks. The national web of roads, railways and airways stretches almost 7,700 km (4,800 mi) from Kaliningrad in the west to the Kamchatka Peninsula in the east, and major cities such as Moscow and Saint Petersburg are served by extensive rapid transit systems.

The export of transport services is an important component of Russia's GDP. The government anticipates that between 2007 and 2030, the measures included in its 2008 transport strategy will increase the export of transport services to a total value of $80 billion, a sevenfold increase on its 2008 value. Foreign cargo weight transported is expected to increase from 28 million tonnes to 100 million tonnes over the same period.

== Aerial cableway ==
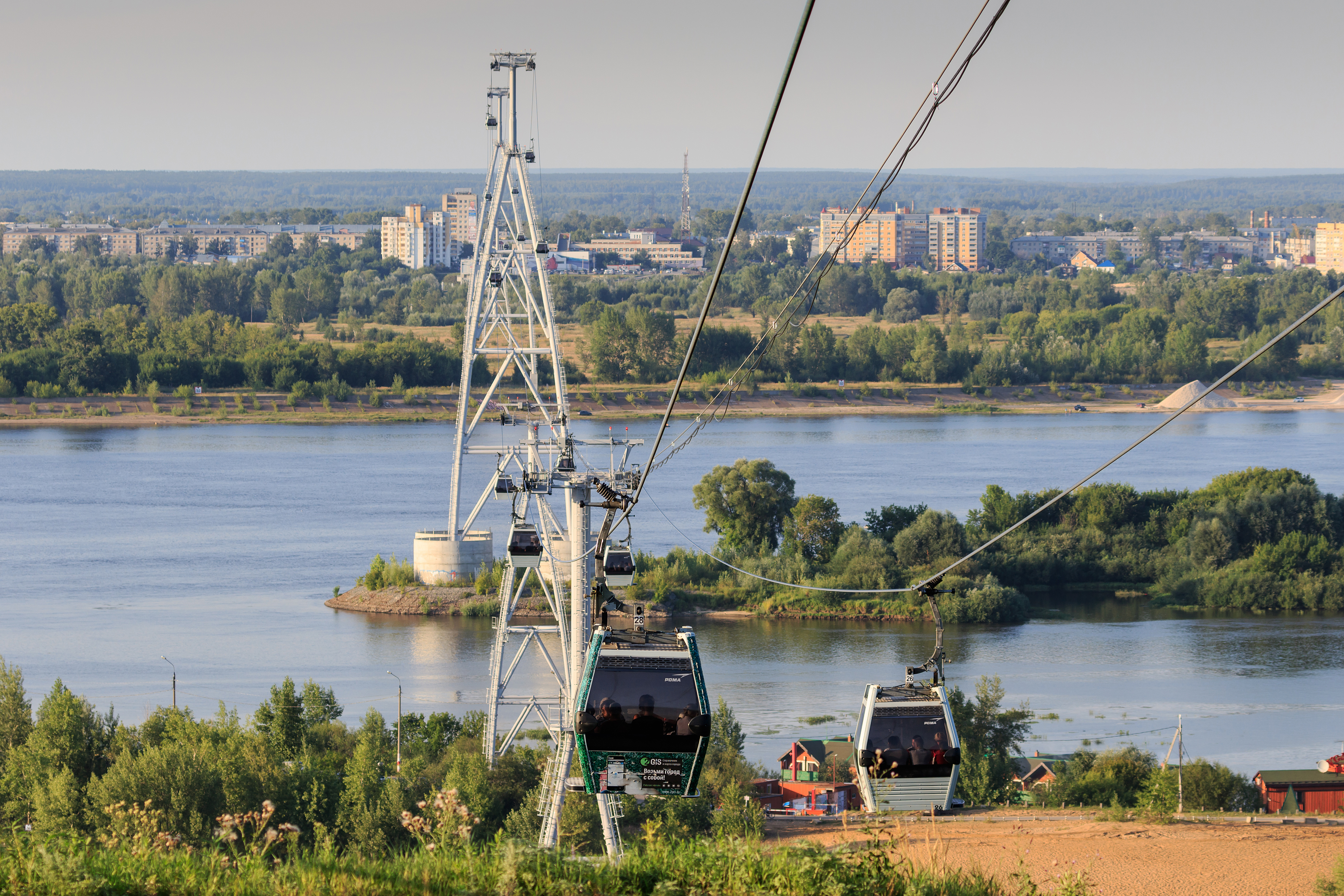
Nizhny Novgorod-Bor Cableway

In 2012, the cableway connecting Nizhny Novgorod and Bor was launched. The length of the cableway is 3.5 km (2.2 miles). It has the largest unsupported span in Europe above the water surface is 861 metres (2,825 feet). The main purpose is to provide an alternative type of passenger transportation in addition to river taxis, electric trains and buses.

== Rail transport ==
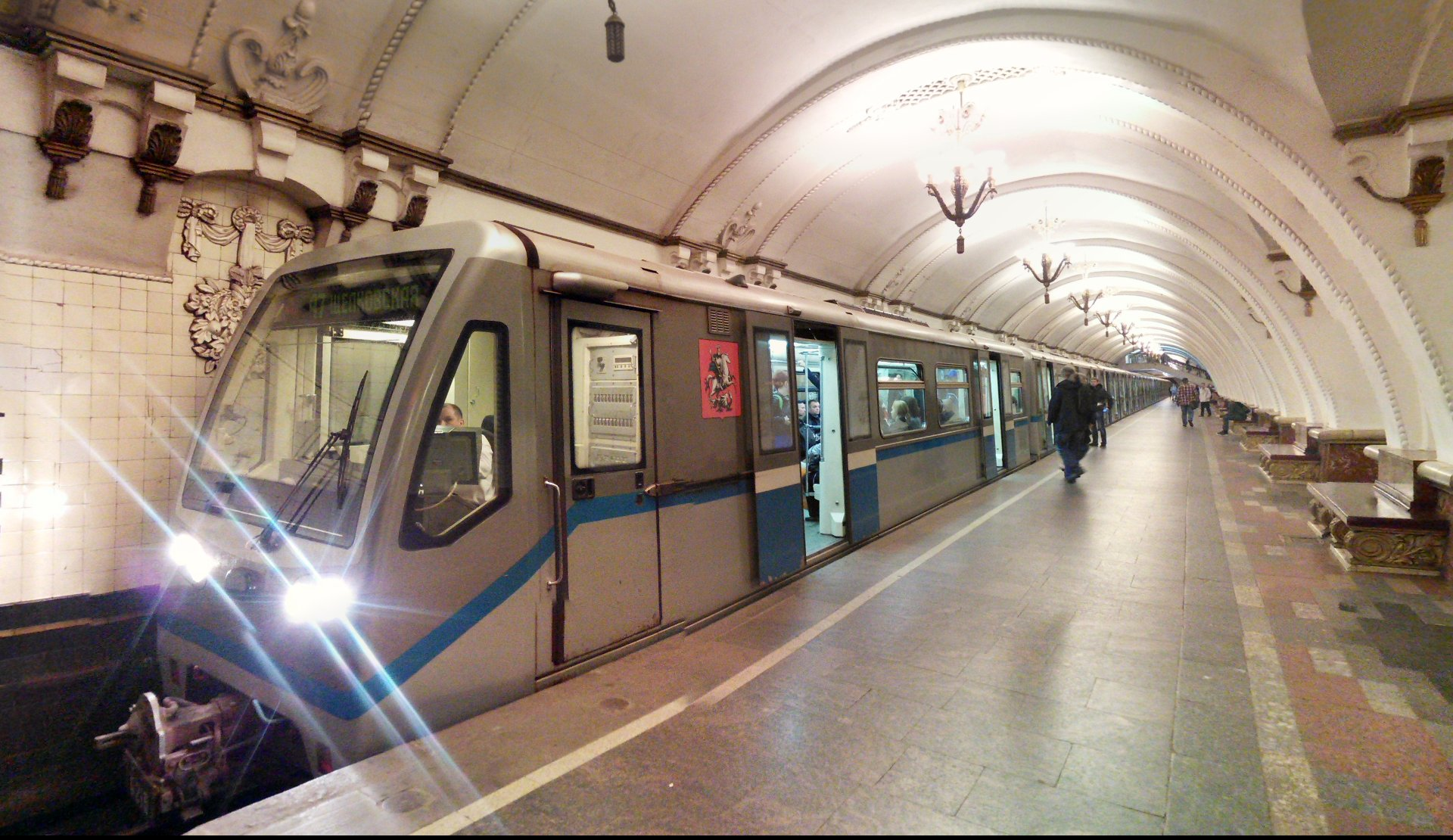
Arbatsko-Pokrovskaya Line

Russia has the world's third-largest railway network, behind only the United States and China, with a total track length of 85,600 kilometres (53,200 mi) as of 2019. It uses a broad rail gauge of 1,520 mm (4 ft 11 27/32 in). Electrified track accounts for around half of the Russian railway network — totalling 43,800 kilometres (27,200 mi) — but carries the majority of railway traffic.

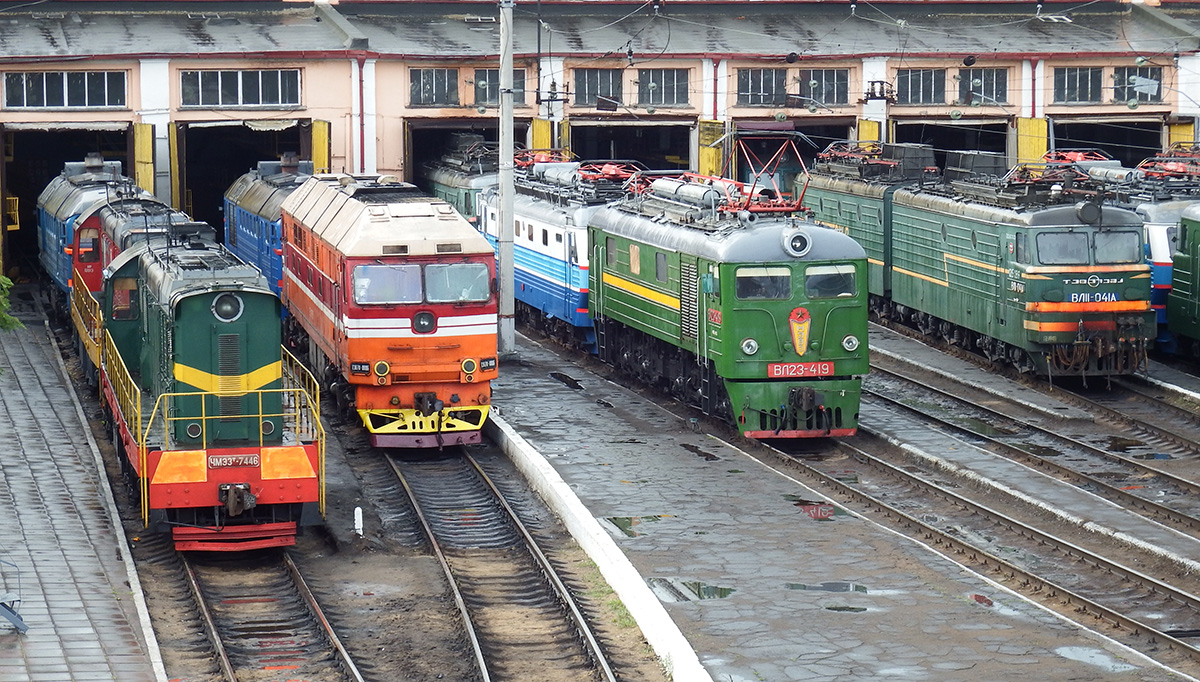
Russian locomotives

Russian Railways, the state-owned national rail carrier, is one of the world's largest transport companies, enjoying a monopoly over rail transport in Russia. Established in 1992, it employs an estimated 950,000 people, and accounted for 2.5% of the entire national GDP in 2009. In 2007 alone, Russian Railways carried a total of 1.3 billion passengers and 1.3 billion tons of freight on its common-carrier routes.

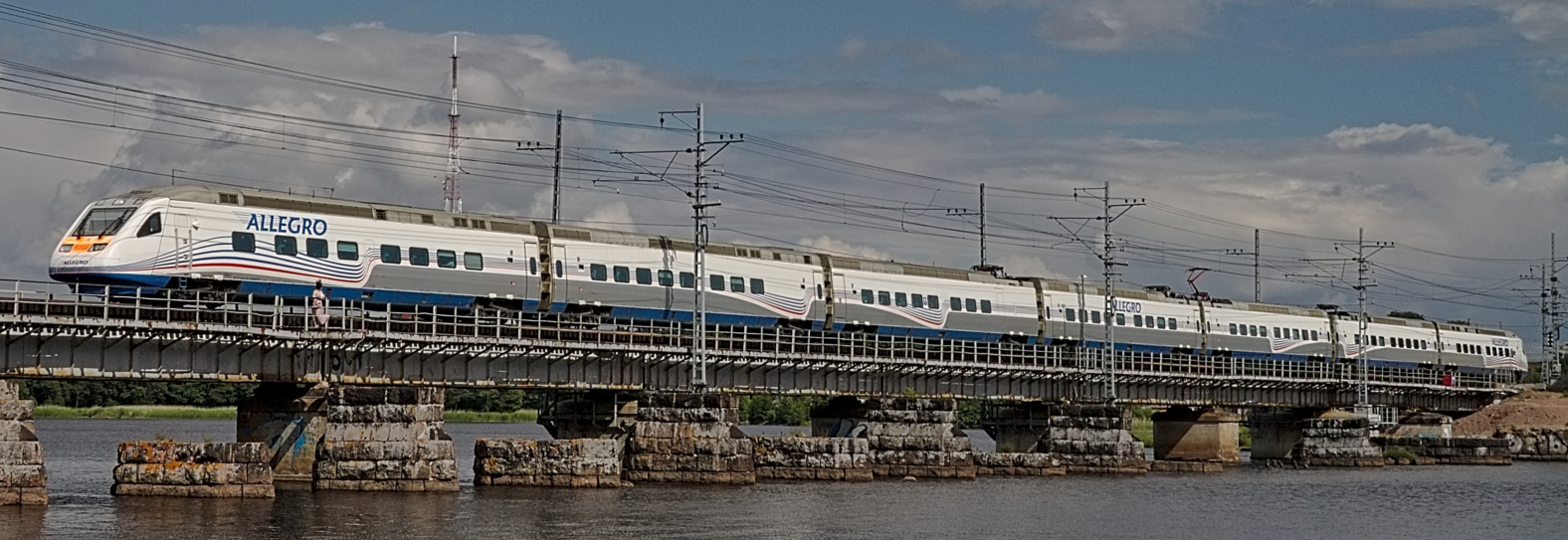
Allegro trains near Vyborg

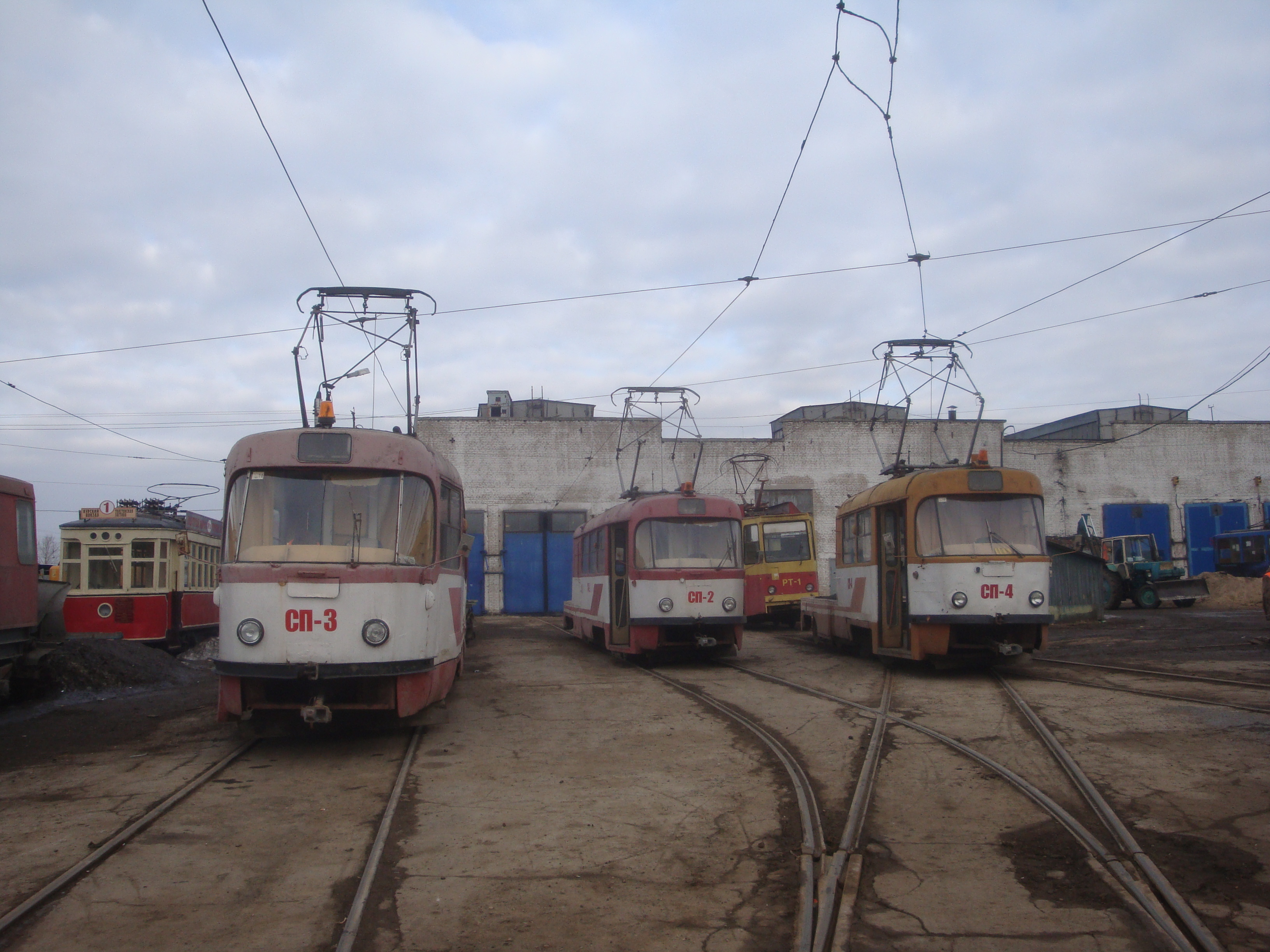
Trams in Tula

=== Rapid-transit systems ===
- Moscow Metro – 13 lines, 207 stations, 349.5 km
- Saint Petersburg Metro – 5 lines, 69 stations, 113.2 km
- Novosibirsk Metro – 2 lines, 13 stations, 15.9 km
- Nizhny Novgorod Metro – 2 lines, 14 stations, 18.8 km
- Samara Metro – 1 line, 10 stations, 12.7 km
- Yekaterinburg Metro – 1 line, 9 stations, 12.7 km
- Kazan Metro – 1 line, 10 stations, 15.8 km

Also, there is a Metrotram system in Volgograd and three more cities with metro systems under construction:

- Omsk
- Chelyabinsk
- Krasnoyarsk

=== Rail links with adjacent countries ===
Voltage of electrification systems not necessarily compatible.

- Norway – No – But Proposed Via Finland & Sweden – break of gauge 1,524 mm (5 ft)/1,435 mm (4 ft 8 1/2 in), or Murmansk – Kirkenes (10 km of 1,435 mm (4 ft 8 1/2 in) on the Norwegian side will probably be widened to 1,520 mm (4 ft 11 27/32 in)
- Finland – Yes — same gauge of 1,524 mm (5 ft)/1,520 mm (4 ft 11 27/32 in)
- Estonia – Yes — same gauge of 1,520 mm (4 ft 11 27/32 in)
- Latvia – Yes — same gauge of 1,520 mm (4 ft 11 27/32 in)
- Lithuania – Yes – same gauge of 1,520 mm (4 ft 11 27/32 in)
- Poland – Yes – Via Kaliningrad Oblast (Note: Trains from contiguous Russia use Belarus route.) – break of gauge 1,520 mm (4 ft 11 27/32 in)/1,435 mm (4 ft 8 1/2 in)
- Belarus – Yes – same gauge of 1,520 mm (4 ft 11 27/32 in)
- Ukraine – No – same gauge of 1,520 mm (4 ft 11 27/32 in)
- Georgia – Yes – same gauge of 1,520 mm (4 ft 11 27/32 in)
- Azerbaijan – Yes – same gauge of 1,520 mm (4 ft 11 27/32 in)
- Kazakhstan – Yes – same gauge of 1,520 mm (4 ft 11 27/32 in)
- China – Yes – break of gauge 1,520 mm (4 ft 11 27/32 in)/1,435 mm (4 ft 8 1/2 in)
- Mongolia – Yes – same gauge of 1,520 mm (4 ft 11 27/32 in)
- North Korea – Yes – break of gauge 1,520 mm (4 ft 11 27/32 in)/1,435 mm (4 ft 8 1/2 in)

== Roads and highways ==
As of 2006 Russia had 933,000 km of roads, of which 755,000 were paved. Some of these make up the Russian federal motorway system. With a large land area the road density is the lowest of all the G8 and BRIC countries as of 2009.

The state of Russia's road system ranks 136th out of 144 countries evaluated. Rustam Minnikhanov, the president of Tatarstan and head of the State Council working group on roads, told the Novosibirsk meeting that 53 percent of federal highways and 63 percent of regional ones are substandard and that the situation is growing worse: Every year, the number of cars in Russia rises by six percent, but the highway system expands only 2200 kilometers. The Kremlin leader blamed this on corruption, the lack of oversight, and the failure to update standards set 30 years ago. According to the Russian Federal State Statistics Service the road network expanded by 504,000 kilometers between 2003 and 2015, though this is largely due to the registration of previously ownerless roads.

=== Road safety ===
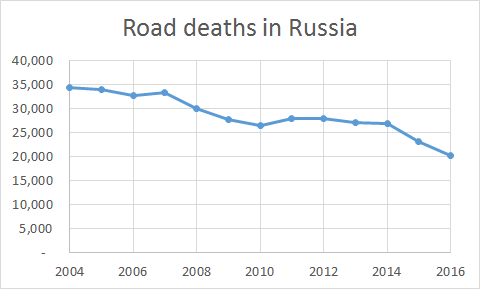
Road deaths in Russia, 2004-2016

Traffic-related death rate was 10.6 per 100,000 inhabitants which was higher than in most of other European countries or in the United States. Increasingly harsher penalties for traffic violations were imposed after 2008, but the level of corruption among traffic law enforcement authorities limits their effectiveness in reducing the number of accidents. Dashcams are widespread, inasmuch as Russian courts prefer video evidence to eyewitness testimony, but also as a guard against police corruption and insurance fraud.

=== Fleet ===
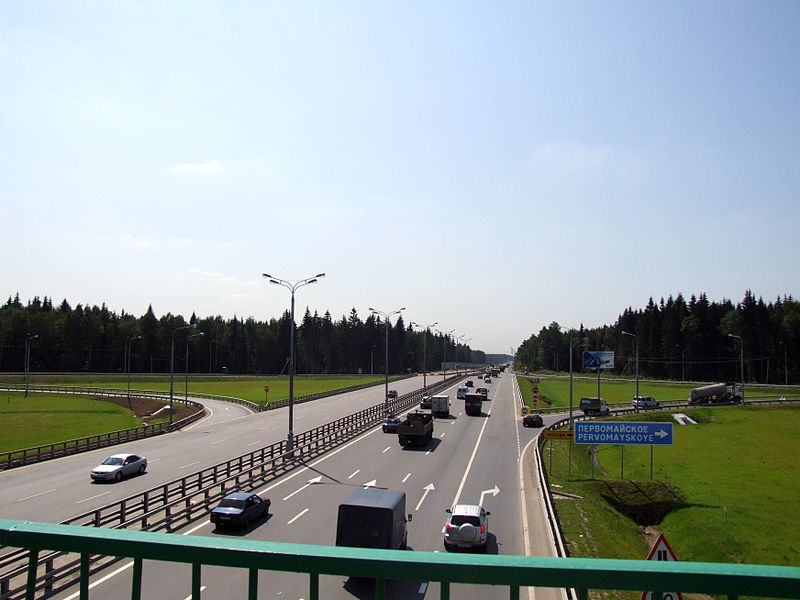
M3 Highway

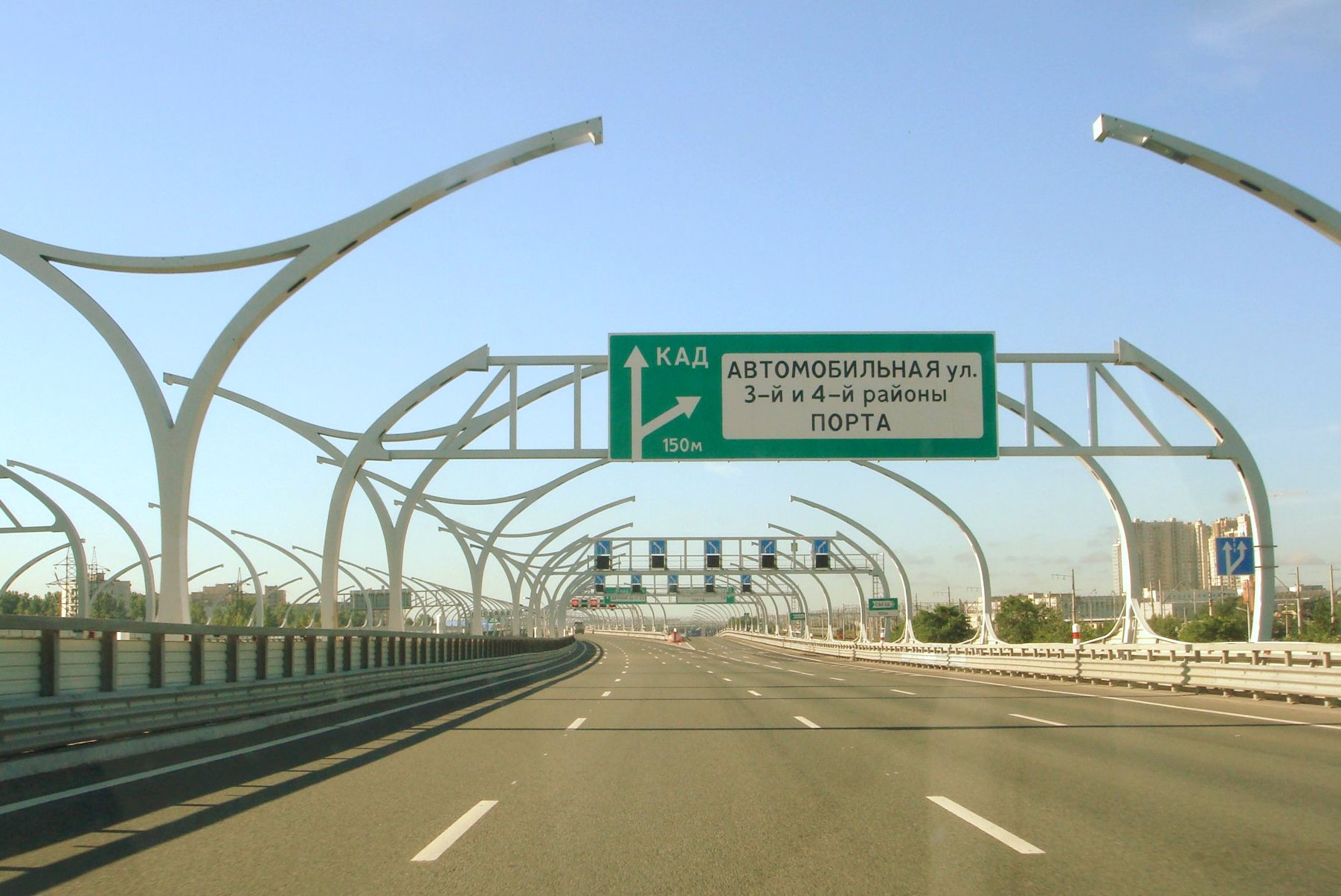
Western High-Speed Diameter road in St. Petersburg

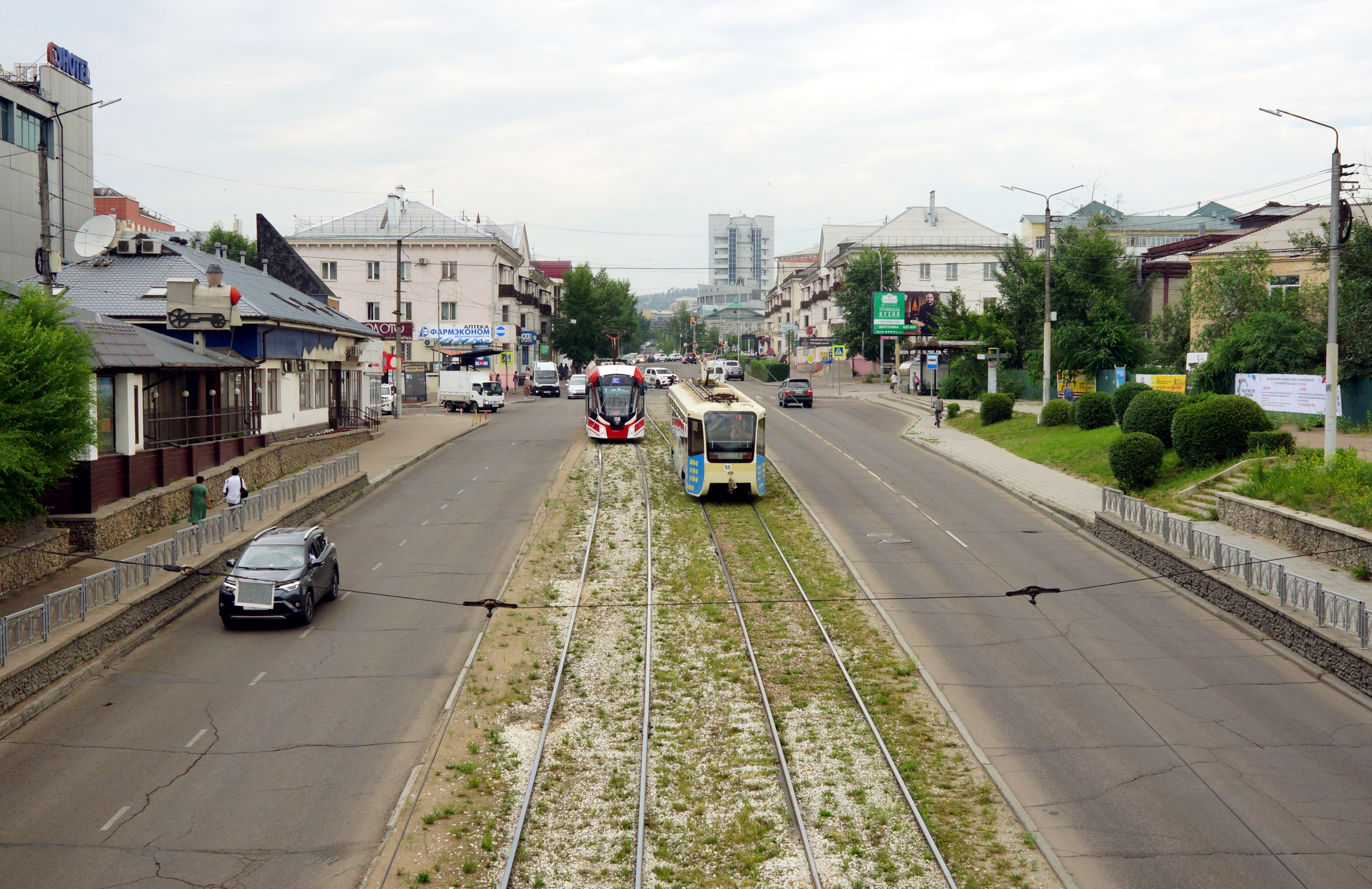
A typical road in a Russian town

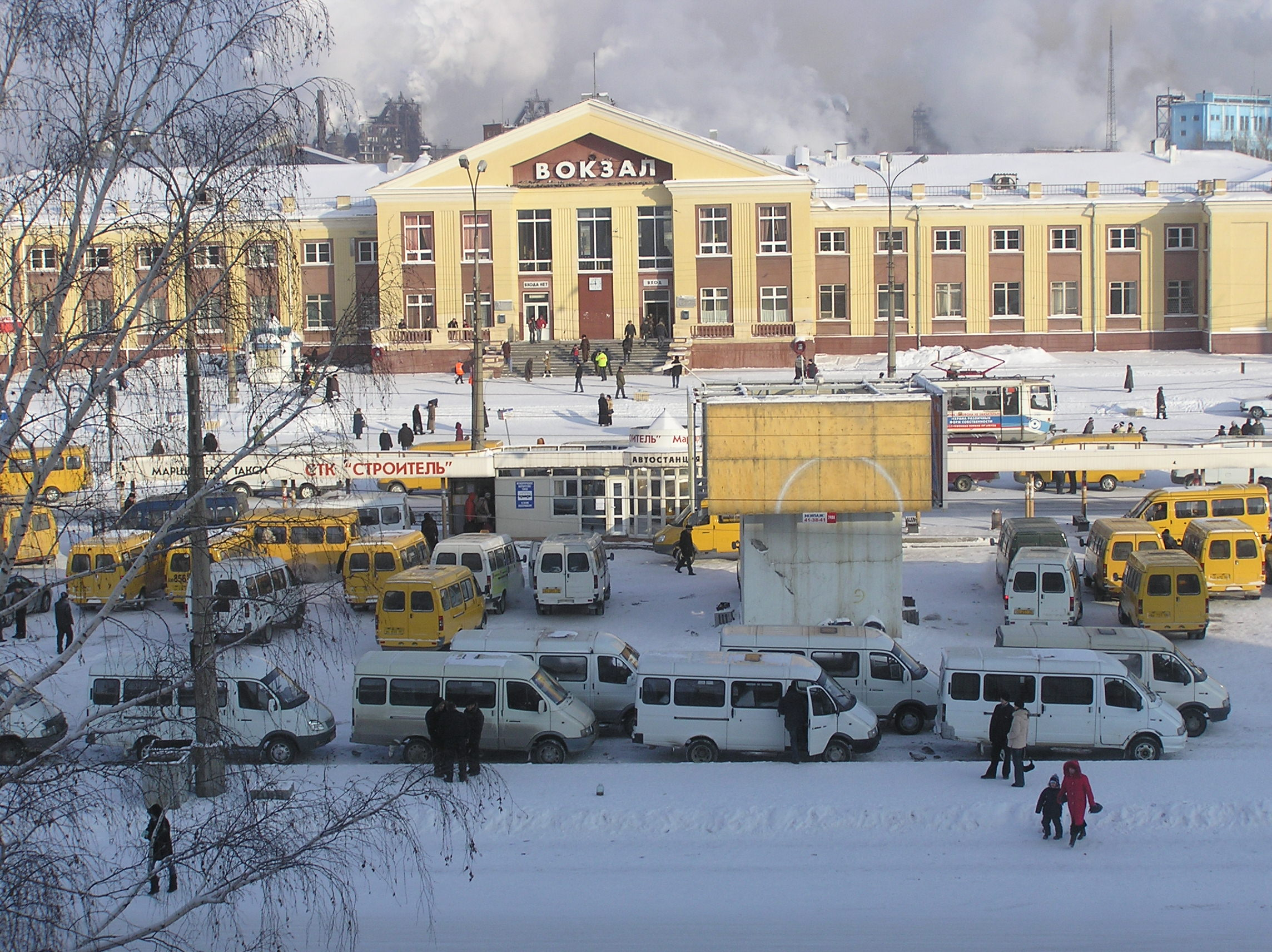
Marshrutkas parked at Nizhny Tagil railway station's parking lot during winter

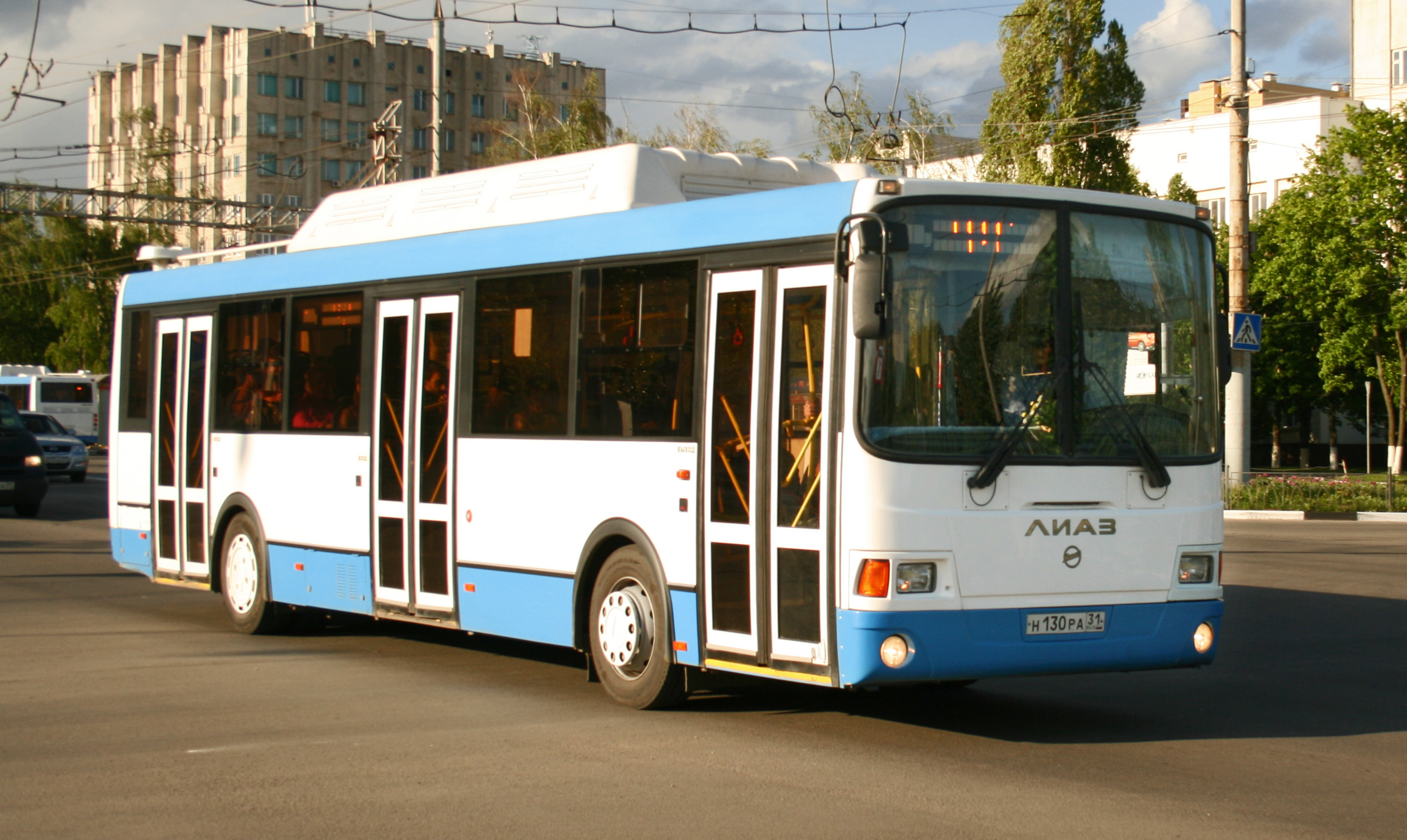
LiAZ buses are the most common city buses in Russia

After World War II, trucks and buses were manufactured for the socialist countries of Eastern Europe: Ikarus urban, intercity and tourist buses, Skoda buses and trucks, Industriewerke Ludwigsfelde and Robur trucks, Tatra, LIAZ, Praga V3S, Csepel, Avia and ZSD Nysa passenger vans and Zuk cargo vans). During the late 1950s OAF trucks were imported from the West, and Berliet T60 dump trucks were imported in 1969 to open the mine and ore-processing plant of Ai in the Orenburg Oblast. Tractors from Volvo and Mercedes-Benz NG were imported during the 1970s for the road-transport organization Sovtransavto. Unic-Fiat tractors were imported in the mid-1970s for the port of Leningrad, and Unit Rig and International Harvester Paystar dump trucks and cement mixers were used for the construction of irrigation canals from 1979 to 1983. Fawn ballast tractors were imported from 1970 to the 1980s, and Komatsu dump trucks began to be imported in 1979. Magirus bonneted flatbed trucks and dump trucks were used in 1975 for the construction of the Baikal–Amur Mainline (BAM).

By the 1980 Summer Olympics in Moscow, priority was given to smaller cars (such as the Mercedes-Benz S-Class W116) as police cars, taxis and vans. However, most vehicles were Soviet-made cars: Moskvitch, GAZ-M20 Pobeda, GAZ, ZiL, VAZ, Izh and ZAZ automobiles, UAZ and LuAZ jeeps, RAF and ErAZ vans, GAZ, Kamaz, ZiL, MAZ, KrAZ, UralAZ, BelAZ and KAZ (Colkhides) trucks, KAvZ, PAZ, LiAZ and LAZ buses and ZiU trolleybuses.

In 1988, the free sale of trucks and buses was permitted. Since the 1990s, many new and used cars have been imported. During the 2000s, foreign companies began to build factories in Russia or enter into agreements with existing assembly plants.

Currently, European and Asian parts of Russia have different fleets. European Russia primarily contains Russian, European, Japanese, American, and Chinese cars and trucks; the Asian side contains used vehicles from the Japanese domestic market, concentrated in Vladivostok. The largest share of Russian auto brands is in the North Caucasus regions of Dagestan and Chechnya.

GAZelle marshrutkas and Ford Transit, Peugeot Boxer, Fiat Ducato, Renault Master, Iveco Daily, Mercedes-Benz Sprinter and Volkswagen Crafter vans and Russian (PAZ), Ukrainian (Bogdan, South Korean (Hyundai County) and Chinese (BAW) minibuses, painted in one color, are used as share taxis. City buses are primarily the Russian (PAZ, KAvZ, LiAZ, MARZ, NefAZ, Volzhanin) and Belarusian MAZ. European buses are used in Vladivostok (51 MAN A78 Lion's City LE buses, Moscow (one Mercedes-Benz Turk O345 Connecto LF, four Ikarus 435, 71 Scania OmniLink assembled in Russia and one MAN A23 Lion's City GL), Kolomna (16 Mercedes-Benz Turk O345 Connecto H and one Mercedes-Benz Türk O345 Conecto LF) and St. Petersburg (16 MAN Lion's Classic and 52 buses Scania OmniLink buses). Other cities run new Chinese and used German, Swedish, Finnish, and Dutch buses. In July 2014, Prime Minister Dmitry Medvedev issued a decree banning foreign technical purchases (including public transport) for state and municipal needs. Intercity buses are Chinese, Korean, and Russian and large companies are buying European buses.

Grey market vehicles, such as the Ford Mustang, Lincoln Town Car, Ford F-Series, Dodge Viper, Toyota Sienna, Toyota 4Runner, Acura, Toyota Highlander, Toyota Venza, Infiniti, Chevrolet Corvette and Chevrolet Camaro, are sold by special dealers. Grey-market US trucks include Freightliner, International, Peterbilt and Volvo. In late 2013 International began selling a Russian version of the International ProStar tractor, and sales of Western Star 6900XD dump trucks were scheduled to begin in 2014.

Vehicle availability (end of year, in thousands)
| | 1990 | 2000 | 2001 | 2002 | 2003 | 2004 | 2005 | 2006 | 2007 | 2008 | 2009 | 2010 | 2011 | 2012 | 2013 | 2014 | 2015 | 2016 | 2017 | 2018 | 2019 | 2020 | 2021 | 2022 | 2023 |
| Trucks (total, including pickups and cargo vans) - total | 2744 | 4401 | 4 482 | 4 625 | 4 669 | 4 770 | 4 848 | 4 929 | 5 168 | 5 349 | 5 323 | 5 414 | 5 545 | 5 751 | 6 047 | 6 238 | 6 230 | 6 300 | 6 434 | 6 490 | 6 540 | 6 564 | 6 664 | 6 673 | 6 796 |
| Owned by companies (Note: For 1990 by road-transport companies, since 2000 by all companies) | 331 | 1387 | 1 311 | 1 216 | 1 110 | 1 015 | 944 | 881 | 830 | 754 | 712 | 683 | 660 | 664 | 665 | 668 | 644 | 570 | 537 | 526 | 527 | 559 | 567 | 567 | 582 |
| Owned by individuals | 4 | 1568 | 1 698 | 1 921 | 1 996 | 2 152 | 2 300 | 2 440 | 2 627 | 2 818 | 2 857 | 2 950 | 3 097 | 3 273 | 3 545 | 3 777 | 3 789 | 3 841 | 3 926 | 4 016 | 4 039 | 3 988 | 3 963 | 3 909 | 3 891 |
| Public buses (Note: 2000-2010, excludes small businesses; since 2011 owned and leased) | 153 | 109 | 107 | 101 | 93 | 86 | 79 | 72 | 69 | 64 | 65 | 158 | 166 | 170 | 166 | 166 | 174 | 171 | 170 | 166 | 166 | 159 | 144 | 138 | 136 |
| Automobiles (total) | 8964 | 20 353 | 21 232 | 22 468 | 23 383 | 24 208 | 25 570 | 26 794 | 29 405 | 32 021 | 33 084 | 34 354 | 36 415 | 38 792 | 41 420 | 43 417 | 44 253 | 45 163 | 46 887 | 47 425 | 48 430 | 49 259 | 50 304 | 50 609 | 51 554 |
| Owned by individuals | 8677 | 19 097 | 19 984 | 21 135 | 22 082 | 22 854 | 24 125 | 25 282 | 27 755 | 30 300 | 31 341 | 32 629 | 34 624 | 36 917 | 39 237 | 41 433 | 42 317 | 43 157 | 44 792 | 45 377 | 46 292 | 46 926 | 47 689 | 47 868 | 48 534 |
| Trolleybuses | 13.8 | 12.2 | 12.1 | 11.9 | 11.8 | 11.6 | 11.4 | 11.3 | 11.2 | 11.2 | 11.0 | 11.1 | 11.0 | 11.0 | 10.7 | 10.7 | 10.2 | 9.7 | 9.4 | 9.0 | 8.7 | 8.0 | 7.9 | 7.6 | 7.7 |

According to the Russian Federal State Statistics Service, in 2013 the number of individually-owned cars per 1,000 of population was 304.1 in the Ural Federal District, 312.6 in Sverdlovsk Oblast, 202.5 in the North-West Federal District, 345.3 in Pskov oblast, 298.5 in the Far Eastern Federal District, 484.8 in Kamchatka Krai, 284.6 in the Central Federal District, 340.5 in the Belgorod Oblast, 274.3 in the Southern Federal District (289.5 in Krasnodar Krai), 261.8 in the Siberian Federal District (292.5 in the Republic of Khakassia and Novosibirsk Oblast), 258 in the Volga Federal District (298.1 in Orenburg Oblast) and 197 in the North Caucasian Federal District (267.2 in Stavropol Krai). The regions with the greatest car ownership are Kamchatka Krai in Asiatic Russia (484.8) and Belgorod Oblast in European Russia (340.5). Those with the least are Chukotka Autonomous Okrug in Asiatic Russia (73.1) and the Republic of Ingushetia in European Russia (130.0).

== Waterways ==
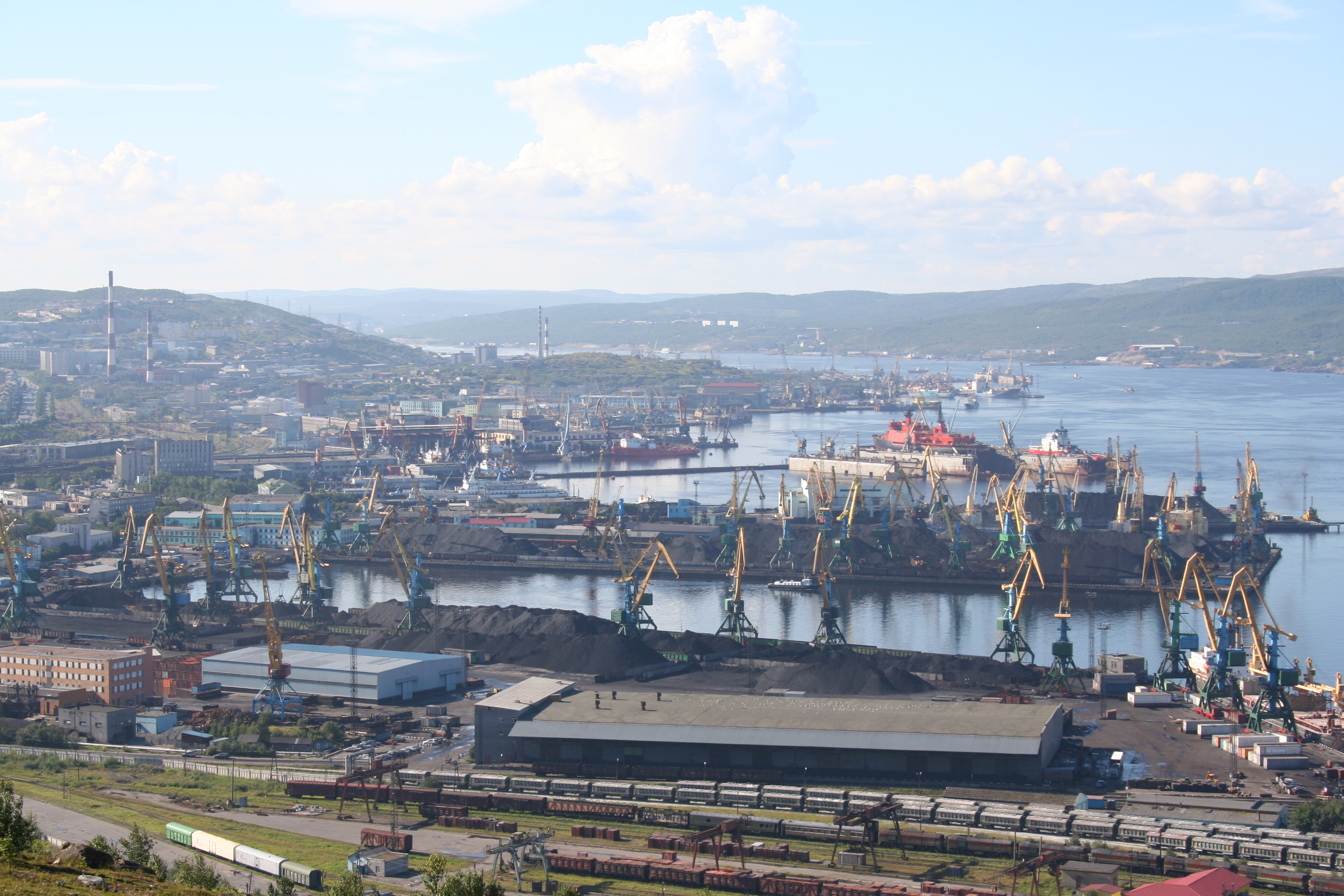
Port of Murmansk

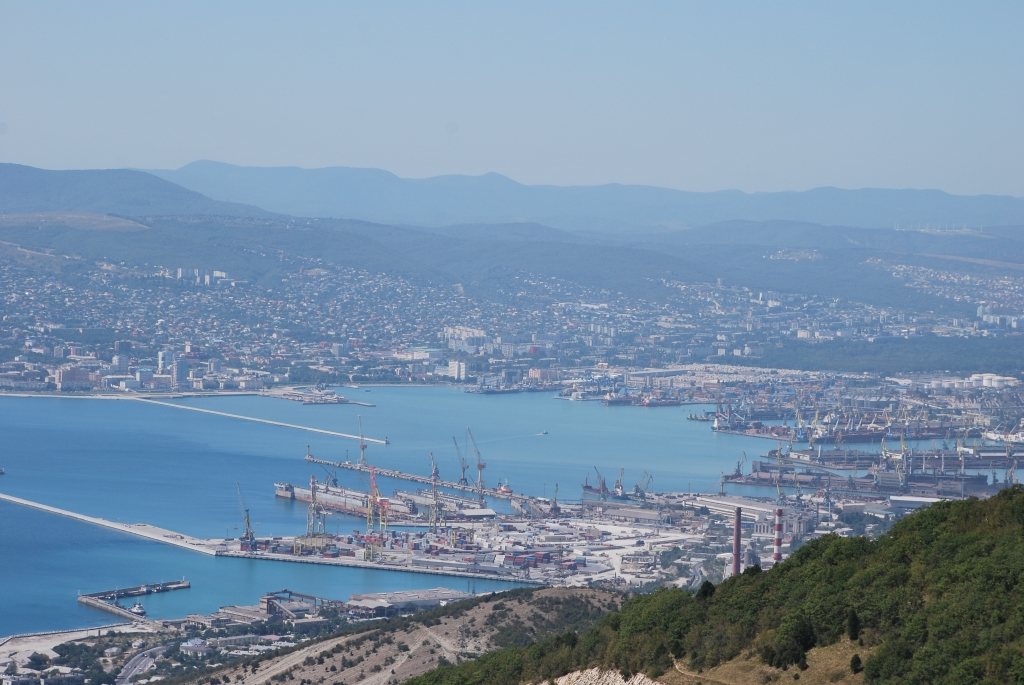
Overview of the Port of Novorossiysk

According to the data from the Maritime Board (Morskaya Kollegiya) of the Russian Government, in 2004, 136.6 million tons of cargo were carried that year over Russia's inland waterways, the total cargo transportation volume being 87,556.5 million ton-km. During that same year, 53 companies were engaged in carrying passengers over Russia's inland waterways; they transported 22.8 million passengers, the total volume of river passenger transportation being 841.1 million passenger-km.

=== Black Sea and Sea of Azov ===
Novorossiysk, Rostov-on-Don, Sochi, Tuapse, Yeysk.

=== Baltic Sea ===
Baltiysk, Kaliningrad, Primorsk, St. Petersburg, Vyborg, Vysotsk.

=== White Sea, Barents Sea, and other seas of Arctic Ocean ===
Arkhangelsk, Dudinka, Igarka, Murmansk, Tiksi, Vitino.

=== Seas of Pacific Ocean ===
Kholmsk, Magadan, Nakhodka Vostochny Port, Nevelsk, Petropavlovsk-Kamchatsky, Vanino, Vladivostok

=== Caspian Sea ===
Astrakhan, Makhachkala.

== Pipelines ==
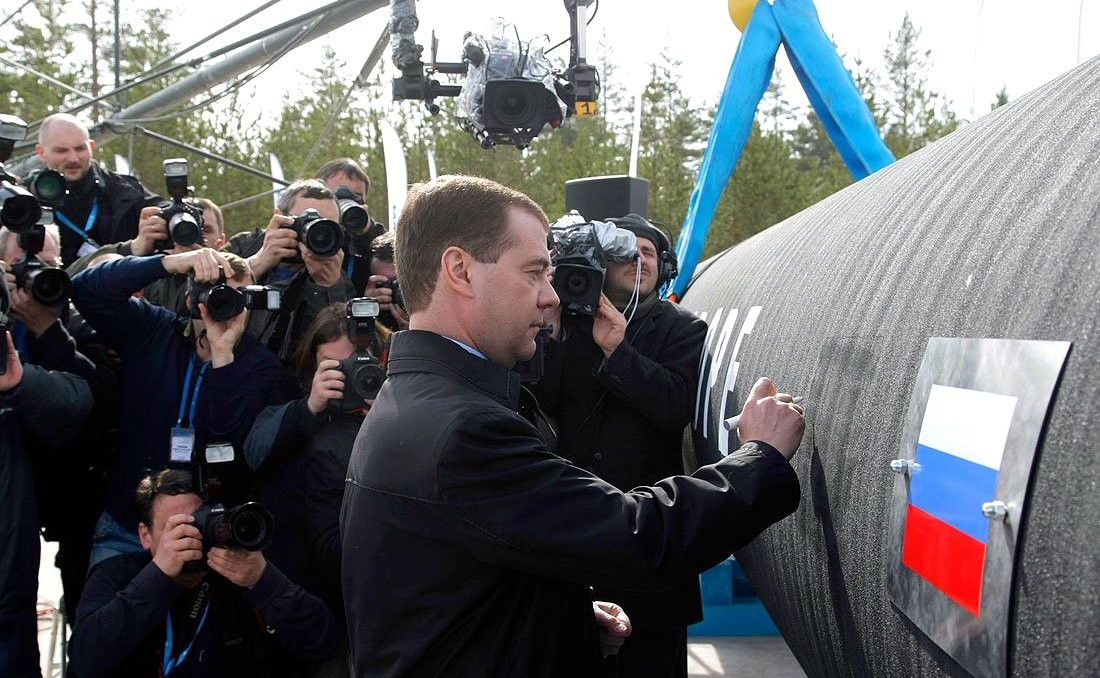
Russian President Dmitry Medvedev at a ceremony marking the start of construction of the Nord Stream gas pipeline's underwater section in Vyborg in 2010

Russia is home to the world's longest oil pipeline, the Druzhba pipeline and in fact one of the biggest oil pipeline networks in the world. It carries oil some 4,000 kilometres (2,500 mi) from the eastern part of European Russia to points in Ukraine, Belarus, Poland, Hungary, Slovakia, the Czech Republic and Germany. The network also branches out into numerous pipelines to deliver oil throughout Eastern Europe and beyond. The name "Druzhba" means "friendship", alluding to the fact that the pipeline supplied oil to the energy-hungry western regions of the Soviet Union, to its "fraternal socialist allies" in the former Soviet bloc, and to western Europe. Today, it is the largest principal artery for the transportation of Russian (and Kazakh) oil across Europe.

On 29 October 2012 president Vladimir Putin instructed the general manager of Gazprom to start the construction of the pipeline. On 21 May 2014, Russia and China signed a 30-year gas deal that was needed to make the project feasible. Construction was launched on 1 September 2014 in Yakutsk by Putin and Chinese deputy premier minister Zhang Gaoli.

== Air transport ==
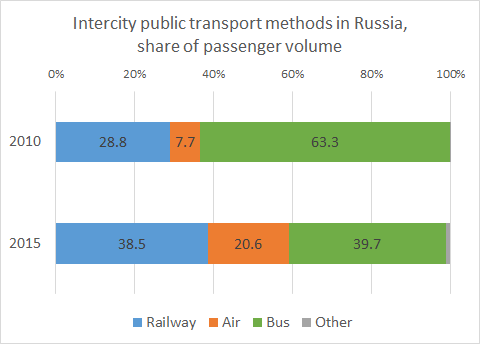
Air travel was becoming a more common method of intercity transport in Russia before 2022

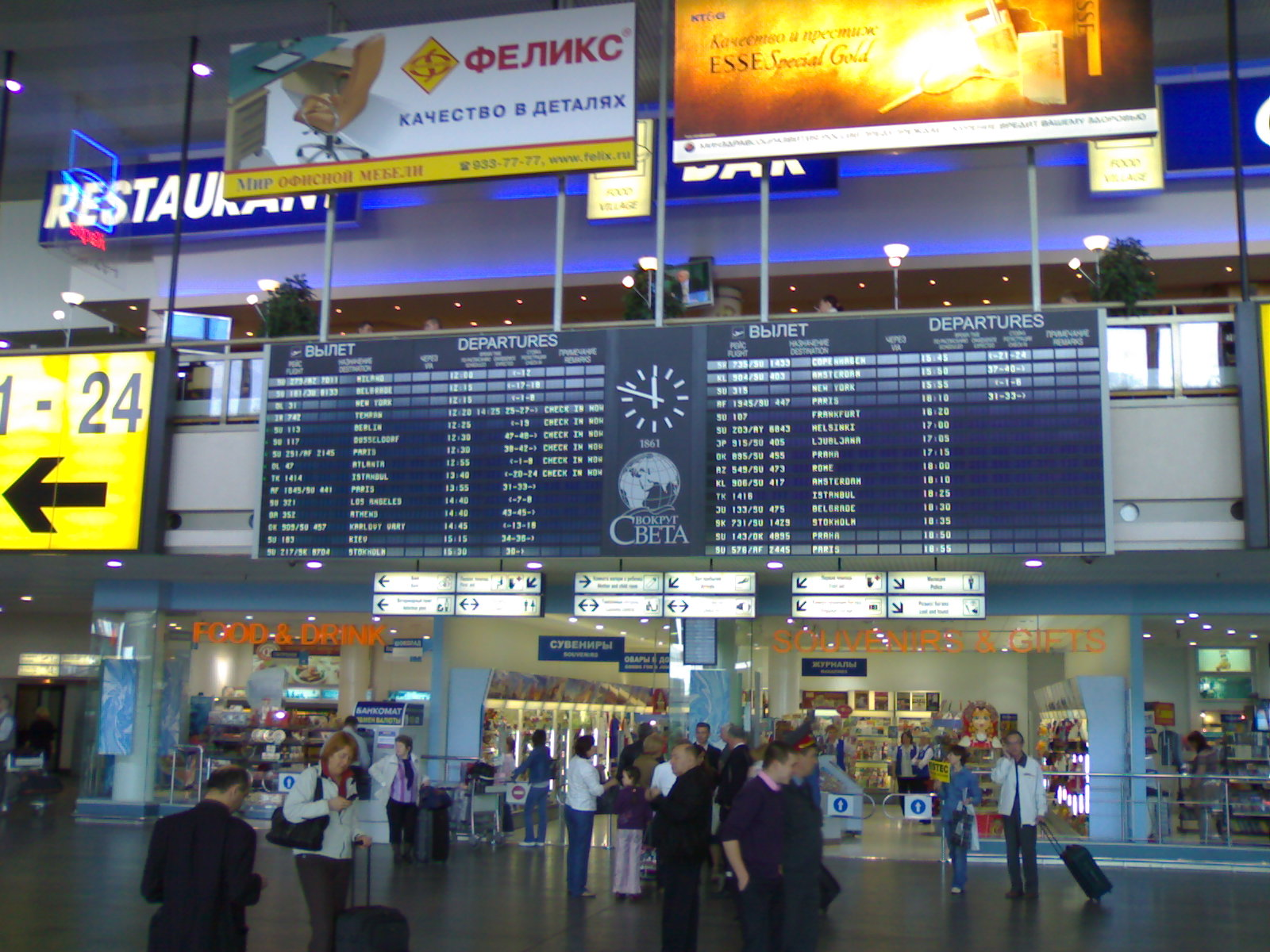
Sheremetyevo International Airport

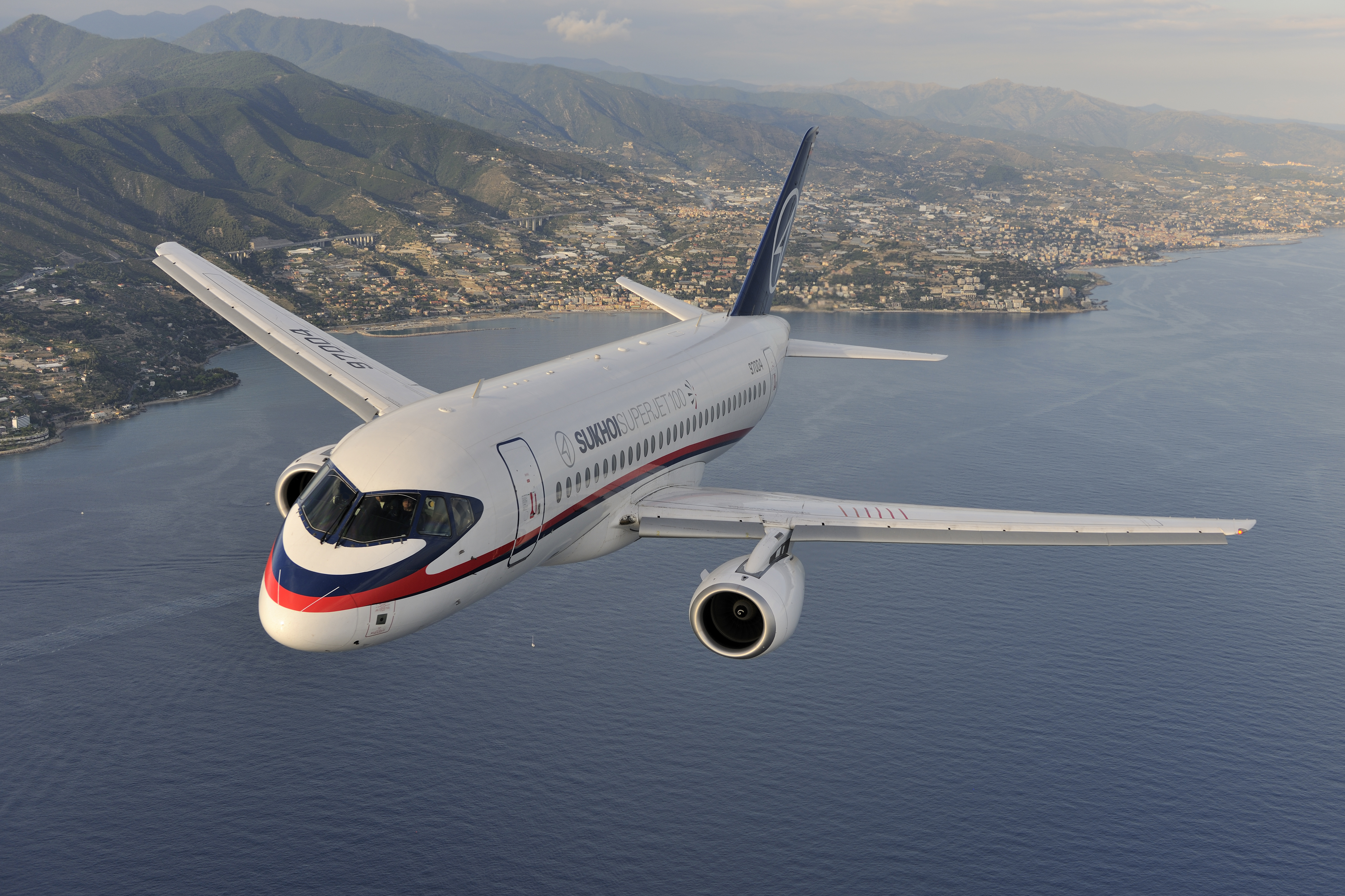
Sukhoi Superjet

As of 2002, there were 2,743 airports in Russia.

Between 2013 and 2022, the Russian government subsidized around 140 domestic air routes covering 12 airports. The subsidies are managed by Rosaviatsia and cover the Crimea, Kaliningrad and Far East regions of Russia.

Aircraft manufacturing is an important industrial sector in Russia, employing around 355,300 people. The dissolution of the Soviet Union led to a deep crisis for the industry, especially for the civilian aircraft segment. The situation started improving during the middle of the first decade of the 2000s due to growth in air transportation and increasing demand. A consolidation programme launched in 2005 led to the creation of the United Aircraft Corporation holding company, which includes most of the industry's key companies. According to the Federal State Statistics Service of the Russian Federation, as of 2012, there were 6,200 civil aircraft in Russia.

=== Airports with paved runways ===
Total: 630
over 3,047 m: 54
2,438 to 3,047 m: 202
1,524 to 2,437 m: 108
914 to 1,523 m: 115
under 914 m: 151 (1994 est.)

=== Airports with unpaved runways ===
Total: 1,887
over 3,047 m: 25
2,438 to 3,047 m: 45
1,524 to 2,437 m: 134
914 to 1,523 m: 291
under 914 m: 1,392 (1994 est.)

== See also ==
- Bering Strait bridge/tunnel
- Ministry of Transport (Russia)
- Plug-in electric vehicles in Russia
- Production of urban electric transport in Russia
