= Urban electric transport in Russia =

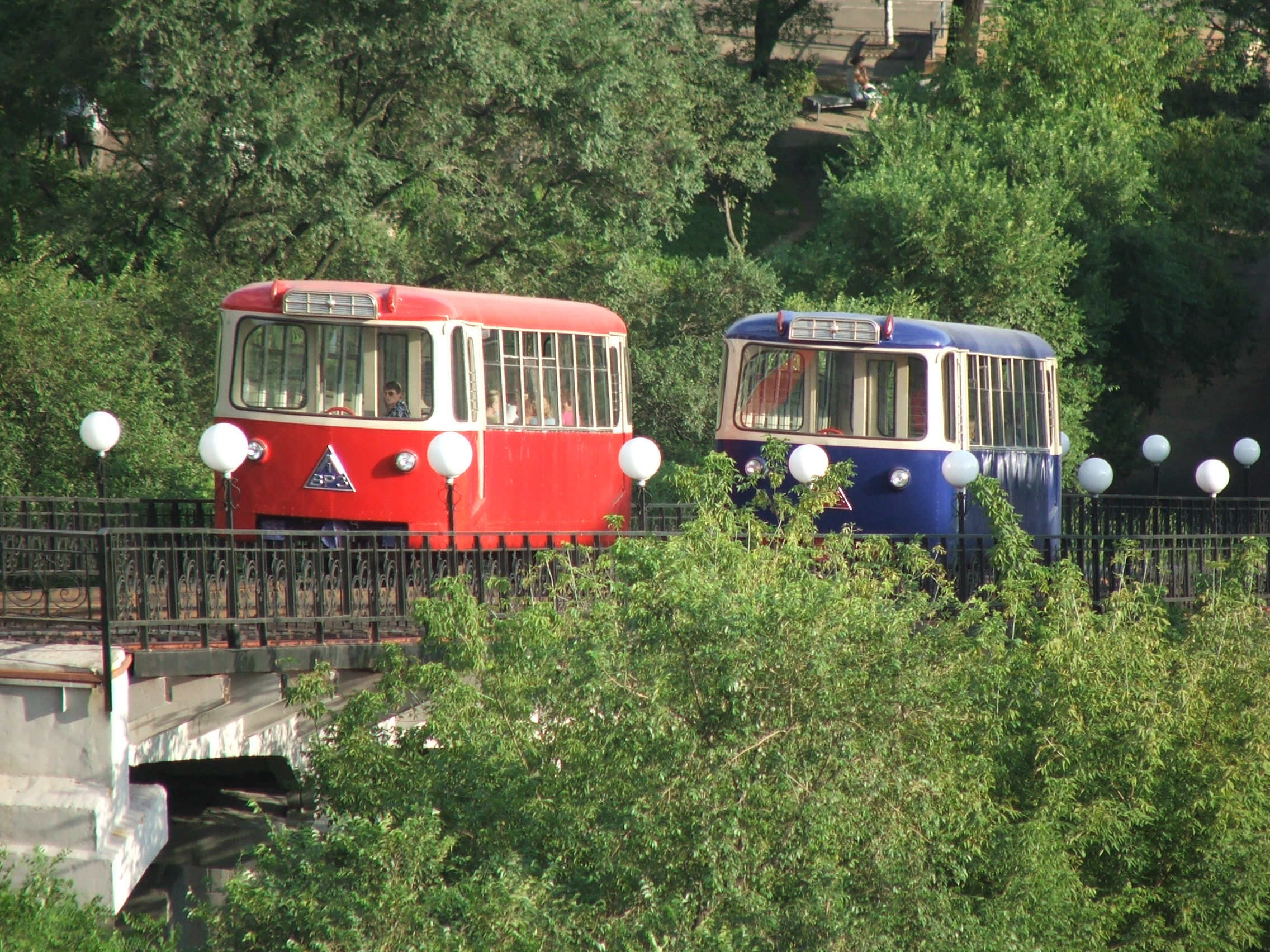
Cars of the Vladivostok funicular

The production of urban electric transport is a branch of Russian engineering. Russia has the largest number of trolley (85) and tram systems (86) in the world.

== Aerial cableway ==
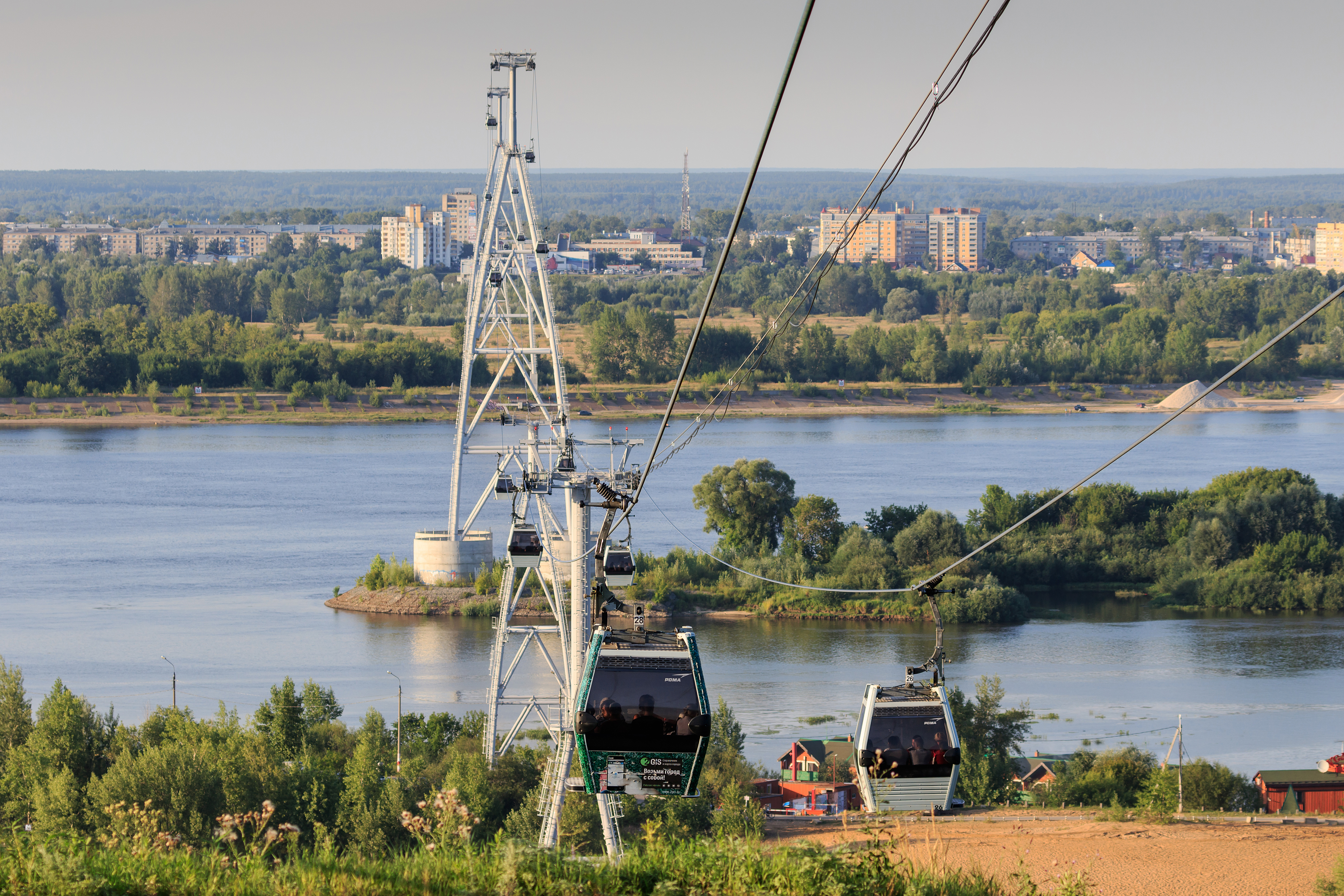
Nizhny Novgorod-Bor Cableway

In 2012, the cableway connecting Nizhny Novgorod and Bor was launched. The length of the cableway is 3.5 km (2.2 miles). It has the largest unsupported span in Europe above the water surface is 861 metres (2,825 feet). The main purpose is to provide an alternative type of passenger transportation in addition to river taxis, electric trains and buses.

== History of trams ==
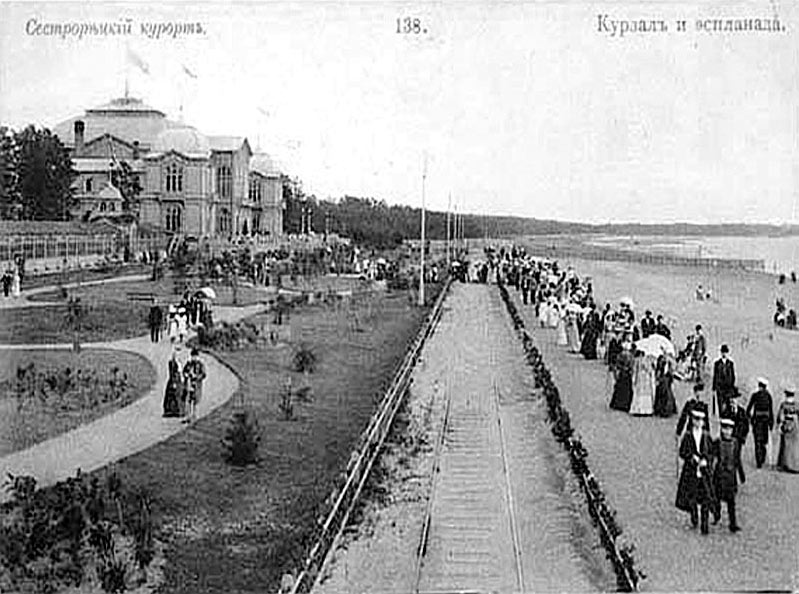
Sestroretsk, the first electric tram in the world

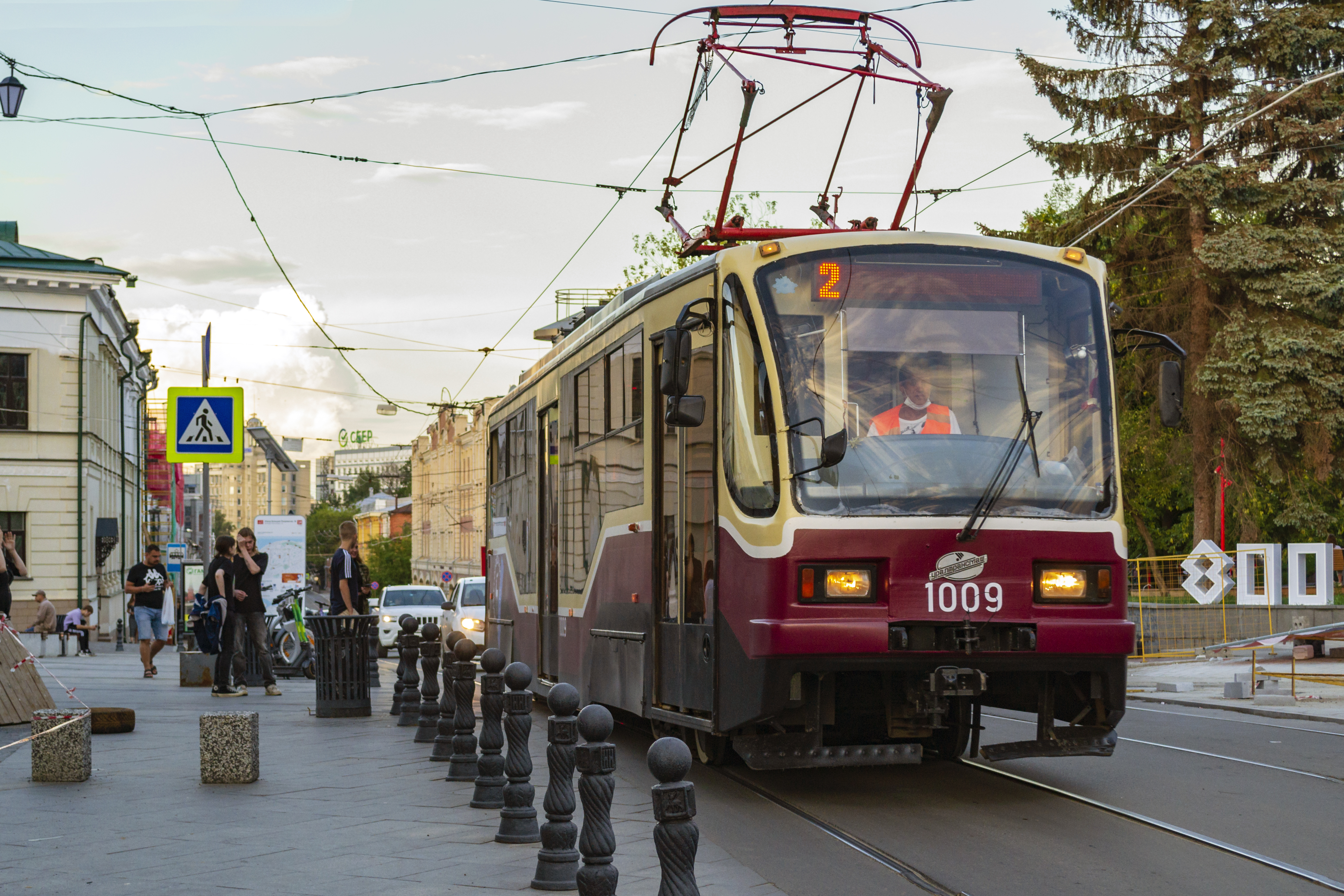
71-407 in Nizhny Novgorod

In 1860 the first urban horse railway line (a predecessor of trams), known as konka—from the Russian kon, "horse"—opened in Saint Petersburg. In 1875, the world's first electric tram line operated in Sestroretsk near Saint Petersburg, Russia, invented and tested by Fyodor Pirotsky. The first electric tram line in the Russian Empire opened in Kiev in 1892. That year, tram production began at the Kolomna Locomotive Works. Before World War I trams were produced at Sormovo, Mytishchi, Nikolaev, Riga and Saint Petersburg, but much of the rolling stock was imported. In 1899, Kursk and Oryol introduced tram lines.

During World War I, the October Revolution and the Civil War tram production was suspended. As the economy of the USSR recovered, tram production resumed in Sormovo, Kharkov, Mytishchi and Kiev. In 1934 the Petersburg Tram Mechanical Factory, the USSR's first dedicated tram factory, opened. Three years later, tram production began at UKVZ. During the Great Patriotic War, tram production was again suspended. In 1957 Gotha trams, used on narrow-gauge lines, were imported from the GDR. The following year, Czechoslovak Tatra T2 trams were imported. In 1963 the Tatra T3 tram, one of the most popular models in the USSR and Russia, was introduced; a total of 11,368 were delivered. Later imports were the Tatra T4, T6B5, K2 and KT4. UKVZ began production of the KTM-5 (71-605 class, the world's largest tram car) in 1969; by 1992, about 15,000 cars were produced.

In the Soviet era Moscow, Kiev and Ufa had Tatra T3 trams; Kazan and Kolomna had KTM-5s. Trams produced at the Petersburg Tram Mechanical Factory (PTMZ, then the Yegorov Leningrad Car Repair Plant) primarily remained in Leningrad, although some were delivered to other cities. After the dissolution of the Soviet Union, used Tatra trams were imported from the former socialist countries of Eastern Europe. The 1990s began a period of decline; in some cities lines were closed, and in others the tracks were removed. In 2005 production of the first Russian semi-low-floor tram, the LVS-2005, began. Three years later Russia's first three-section articulated tram, the LVS-2009 (71-154 class), was introduced. In 2013, the Petersburg Tram Mechanical Factory declared bankruptcy.

Tram plants dating to the former USSR
Name	Location	Founded	Models	Status
UKVZ	Ust-Katav	1758	KTM-5 (71-605 type)	UKVZ
Leningrad factory repair municipal electric	Leningrad	1929	LM-68M	Bankrupt 2013
Rīgas Vagonbūves Rūpnīca	Riga, Latvian SSR	1895	RVZ-6	Ceased production 1987

== History of trolleybuses ==
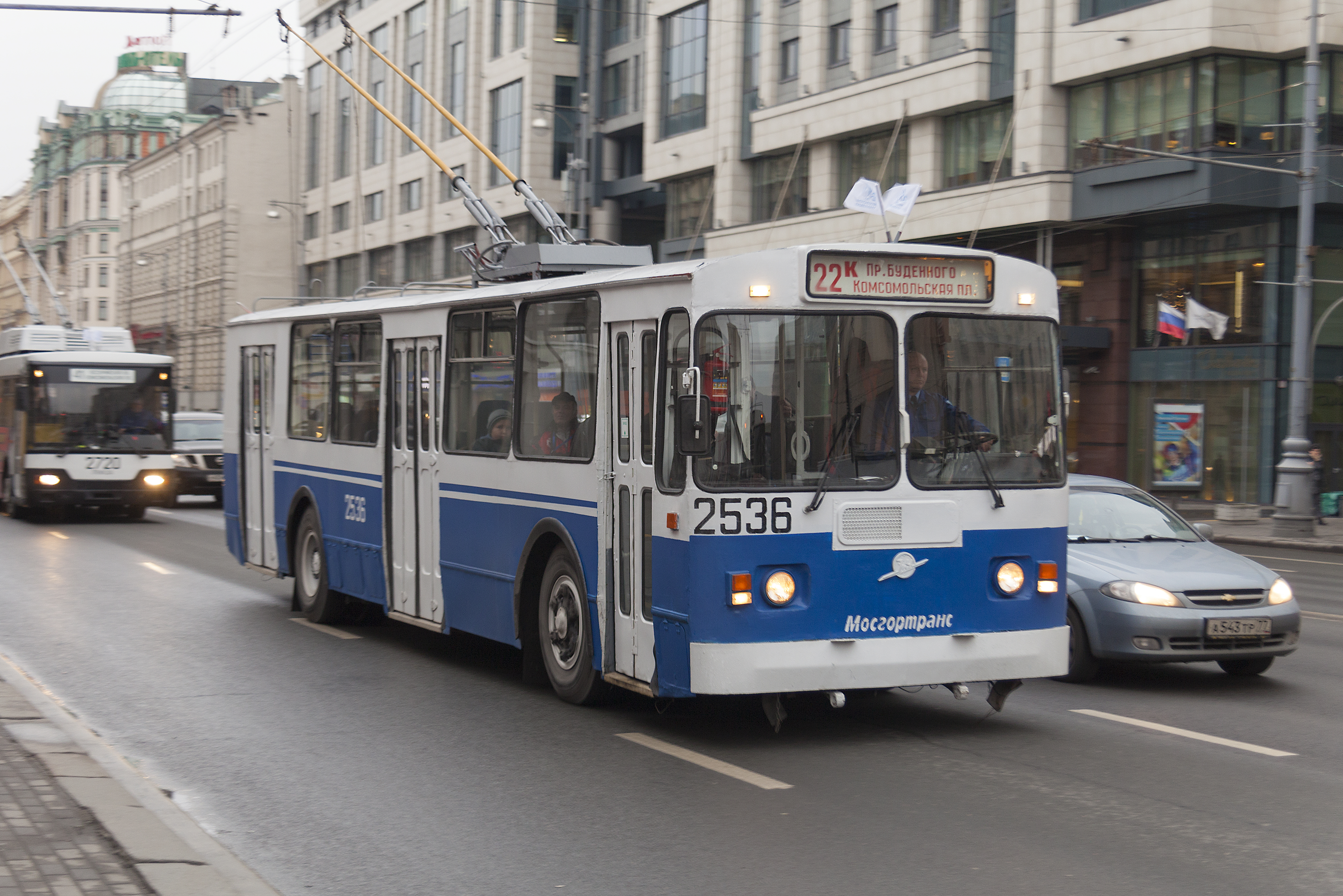
ZiU-9 in Moscow

In 1933 the Soviet Union's first trolleybus network (and the world's largest) debuted in Moscow, and production of the first Soviet trolleybus (the LK-1, named for Lazar Kaganovich) began. During the Great Patriotic War, trolleybus production and service were suspended. Production resumed at the Tushino engineering plant in 1946. In 1961, importation of the Czechoslovak trolley Skoda 9Tr began; during the 1980s, the Skoda 14Tr and 15Tr were imported. Production of the ZiU-9, the world's largest trolley, began in 1972; more than 42,000 were built. During the 1990s, some trolleybus repair plants began producing their own models.

Trolleybus plant dating to the former USSR
Name	Location	Founded	Closed	Models	Status
ZiU	Engels	1868	2017	ZiU-9	Trolza

== Subway history and production ==
In 1935, the Moscow Metro opened. Subway-car production began at the Mytishschinsky Engineering Plant (now Metrowagonmash). Metro service continued during the Great Patriotic War. In 1955, the Leningrad Metro was built.

Subway-car plants
Name	Location	Founded	Models	Status
Mytishchi mechanical plant	Mytishchi	1897	81-717/714	Metrowagonmash
Yegorov Railcar Plant	Leningrad	1874	81-717/714	Bankrupt 2013

== Current production ==
The electric-transport market in Russia is dominated by three Russian trolleybus manufacturers, three tram manufacturers and two subway-car manufacturers but vehicles are also often imported from Belarus.

Tram manufacturers
Name	Location	Founded	Parent company	Types	Models
UKVZ	Ust-Katav	1758	Roscosmos	Semi-low-floor single-section and semi-low-floor articulated three-section trams	71-623, 71-628, 71-631
Ural Plant of Transport Engineering (Uraltransmash)	Yekaterinburg	1817	Uralvagonzavod	Single-section high- and low-floor trams, three-section articulated low-floor trams	71-415, 71-411, 71-418
PC Transport Systems	Tver	2015		Single-section low-floor trams, three-section articulated low-floor trams	71-911, 71-931

Trolleybus manufacturers
Name	Location	Founded	Closed	Parent company	Types	Models
Trolza	Engels	1868	2017		Single high-floor and low-floor, articulated low-floor and high-field	ZiU-682G-016, Trolza-5275 Optima, Trolza-5265 Megapolis, Trolza-6205, Trolza-6206 Megapolis.
PC Transport Systems	Engels	2017			Single low floor trolleybus	
Bashkir Trolleybus Plant (BTZ)	Ufa	1964 (as trolley and tram repair plant), 1998 (trolleybus production)			Low-floor and high-field single	BTZ-52763, BTZ-52765, BTZ-52768
VMZ (Vologodskiy mechanical plant)	Vologda	1994			Single low-floor, articulated low-floor and high-field	VMZ-5298.01, VMZ-5298.01-50 Avantgarde, VMZ-6215, VMZ-62151
Sokolniki Carriages Building Plant (SVARZ)	Moscow	1905		Mosgortrans	Semi-low-floor single, low-floor articulated (Belarusian kits)	SVARZ-6235 (based on the MAZ-103) bus, SVARZ-6237

Subway-car manufacturers
Name	Location	Founded	Parent company	Models
Metrowagonmash	Mytishchi	1897	Transmashholding	81-717/714, 81-740/741 "Rusich", 81-760/761 "Oka"
Kirov Plant	Saint Petersburg	1801		81-556/557/558 "Neva"

== See also ==
- Transport in Russia
- Automotive industry in Russia
- List of trolleybus systems in Russia
- List of town tramway systems in Russia
