= Nizhny Novgorod Cableway =

Gondola lift across the Volga River in Russia

Coordinates: 56.3377°N 44.0493°E

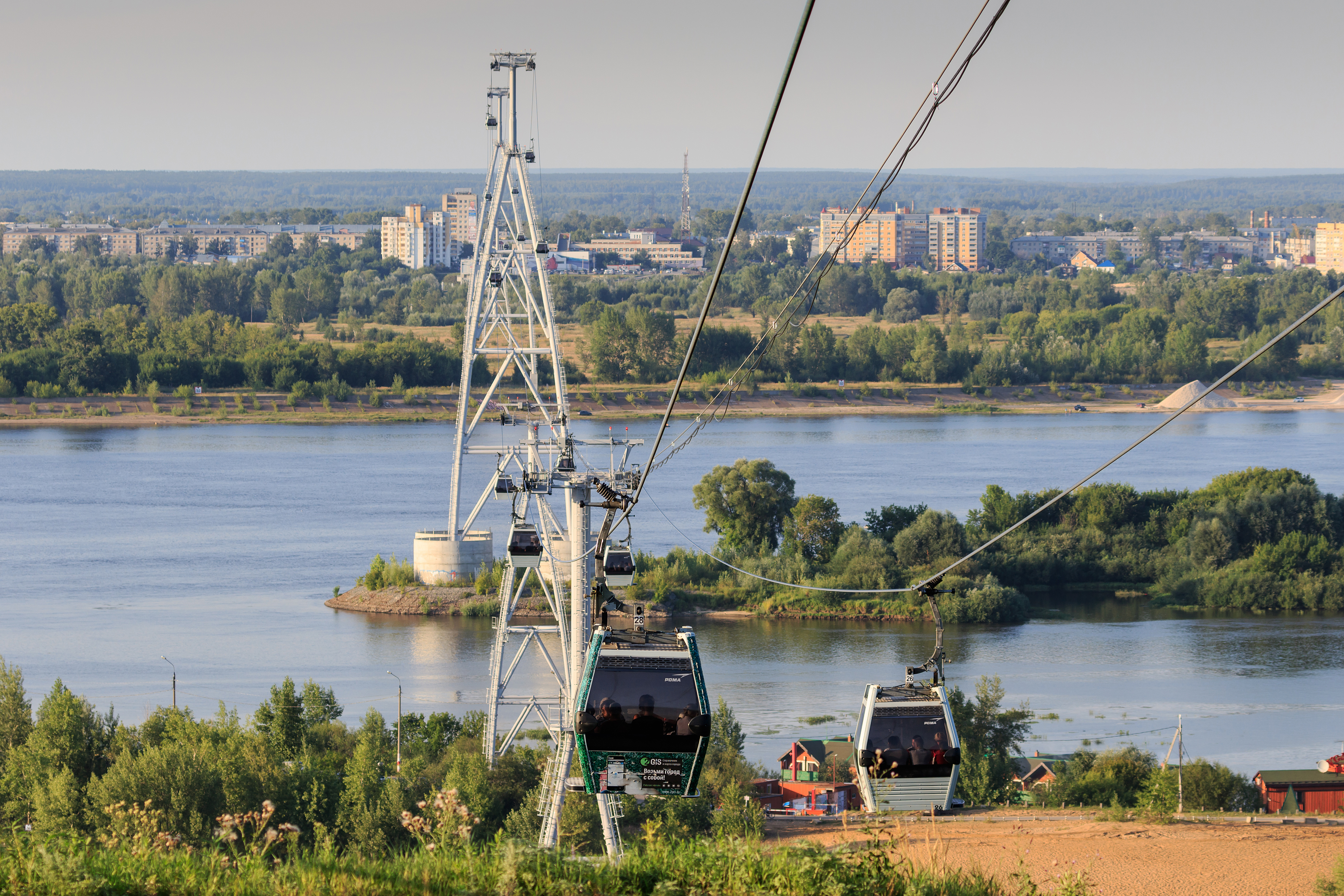
- Public transport
- Interactive map of Nizhny Novgorod Cableway

Overview
- Status: In operation
- Character: Gondola lift
- Location: Nizhny Novgorod and Bor, Nizhny Novgorod Oblast, Russia
- Termini: Nizhny Novgorod (west); Bor (east)
- No. of stations: 2
- Open: 9 February 2012

Operation
- Owner: JSC Nizhniy Novgorod ropeway
- Operator: JSC Nizhniy Novgorod ropeway
- Ridership: up to 5,000 per day

Technical features
- Line length: 3,661 m (12,011 ft)
- Operating speed: 22.5 km/h (14.1 mph)
- Notes: Electric motor powering cable bullwheel
- Vertical Interval: 95 meters (maximum)
Route map
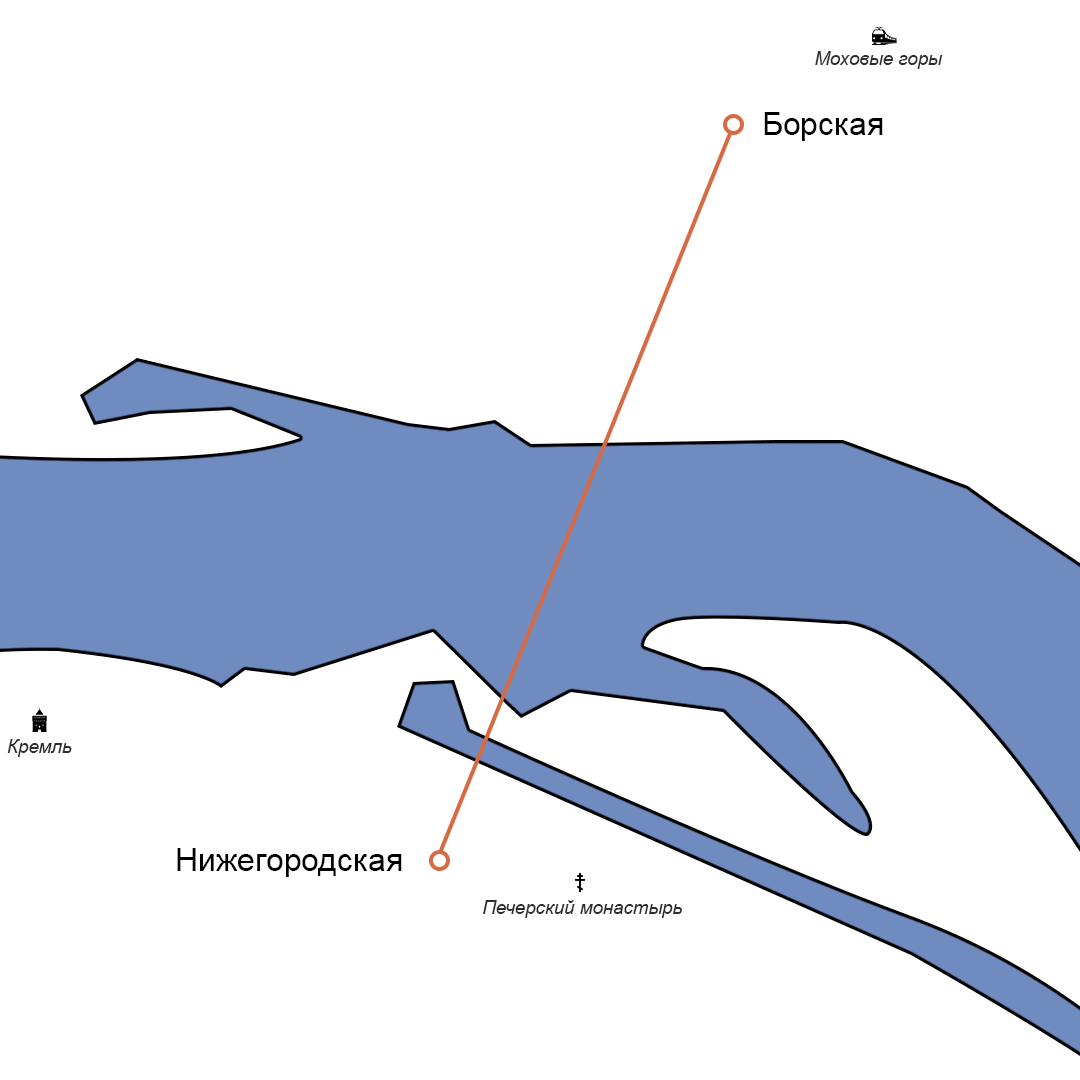

Nizhny Novgorod Aerial Cableway (Russian: Нижегородская канатная дорога) is a 3,660-meter-long gondola lift cable car. It connects the city of Nizhny Novgorod in Russia with the town of Bor.

Built by Poma and inaugurated in February 2012, it crosses the Volga River in a 900-meter-long span on two 82-meter-high masts, and six further masts on its full length. A one-way trip takes 13 minutes.

== History of construction ==
On 21 December 2007, Poma of France presented a cable car project for Nizhny Novgorod.

In 2009, JSC "Energomash" and Project team "StroyArchitecture" (Moscow) completed the development of a set of drawings, the company had to produce 10 supports with a height of 40 to 80 m and a total weight of steel structures – 560 tons.

On 4 November 2009, two oversized items, the two highest 82-metre supports, were transported by road to Nizhny Novgorod. Each support weighed 6 tons. By this time the total weight of the shipped metalwork made 530 metric tons.

On 22 December 2009, permission was obtained for the construction of a cable car in the city district of Bor, and on 12 January 2010 – in Nizhny Novgorod. Construction and installation work began on 20 January 2010. By February 2010, steel structures had been delivered to the urban district of Bor, and the equipment was paid for 30% and was being prepared for shipment from France. The opening of the cable car was planned for September 2010, however, in May 2010, during the construction phase, the project documentation was sent for revision, after which the state examination was again required.

According to the Director of JSC "Nizhny Novgorod cable cars", Paul Fomichev, by December 2010, all the work on the installation of supports was completed. The opening date was shifted to the second quarter of 2011. However, in February 2011, work was still underway to install the T7 support located on the island.

In September 2011, work began on the installation of the technological rope using the Ka-32T helicopter. The work was carried out with overlaps of individual sections of the Volga (between the corresponding supports) for three hours for several days.

In total, 78 road trains were required for the delivery of metal structures for the supports, 47 trucks for the delivery of equipment. Sea ferry and railway transport were also used for the delivery of the rope. The first passengers in the test trip were 16 officials headed by Governor Valery Shantsev. Initially, it was planned to carry out tests with sandbags, but they did not have time.

== Cost of travel ==
The cost of one one-way ticket is 100 rubles (approximately 1.50 US dollars or 1.20 GBP) For comparison, the cost of travel on the Nizhny Novgorod metro is 28 rubles, on buses, trolleybuses and trams the same (approximately US$0.42 or 0.35 GBP) the Cost of a ticket for an electric train from Bor to Nizhny Novgorod is 46 rubles (US$0.66 or 0.57 GBP) .

== Operational history ==
On 9 February 2012, the passenger cable car between the cities of Nizhny Novgorod – Bor began to carry passengers. A week after the launch, on 15 February, due to the strong wind, the automation was triggered and the cable car was stopped. To ensure the transportation of all passengers of the company "Logoprom – Bor transportation" in addition to the two vessels hovercraft khivus-10 on the line were withdrawn 48-local court khivus-48. On 25 February, the situation was repeated: automatic equipment stopped the cable car 9 times due to wind gusts, after which the transportation was suspended for several hours. On 22 March, over the Rowing canal a few hundred meters from the cable car, a Bell 407 helicopter crashed, hitting the power line wires. The cable car equipment was not affected. In May 2012, passenger traffic began to exceed the cableway's capacity at times. During the first year of operation, the number of passengers was almost 2 million people. On the morning of 31 July 2014 on the cable car there was an emergency. In the prop next to the cabin, where there were people, was struck by lightning. At this time in Nizhny Novgorod was a strong storm and the cable car was decided to suspend. However, the traffic in the booths already occupied. As the eyewitness tells, blow was such force that people even sat down. At the station, passengers came out on shaky legs By October 2015, 6.68 million people were transported, by August 2016 – 8 million people, and by April 2018 – 10.77 million people.

== Gallery ==
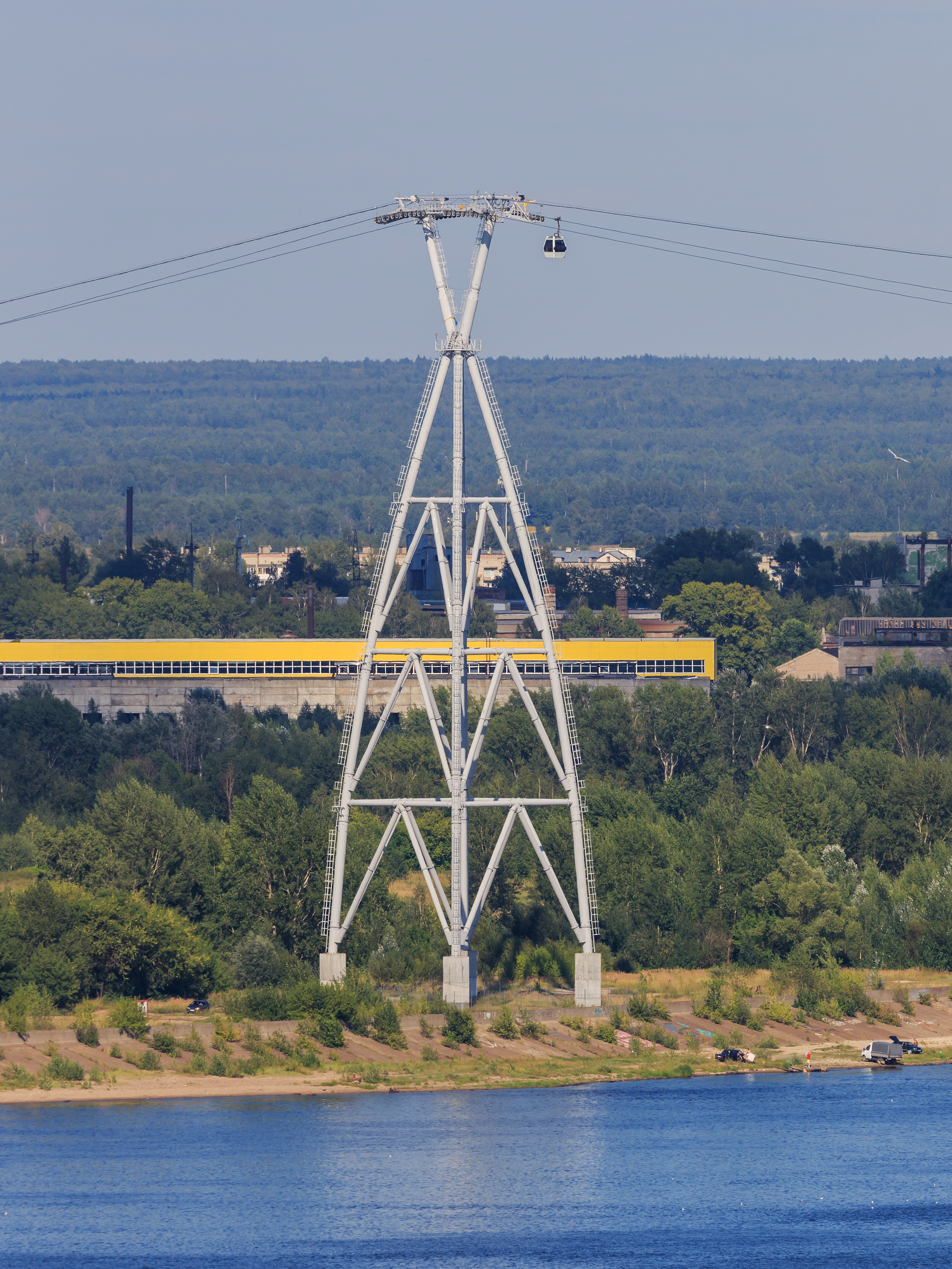
Pylon

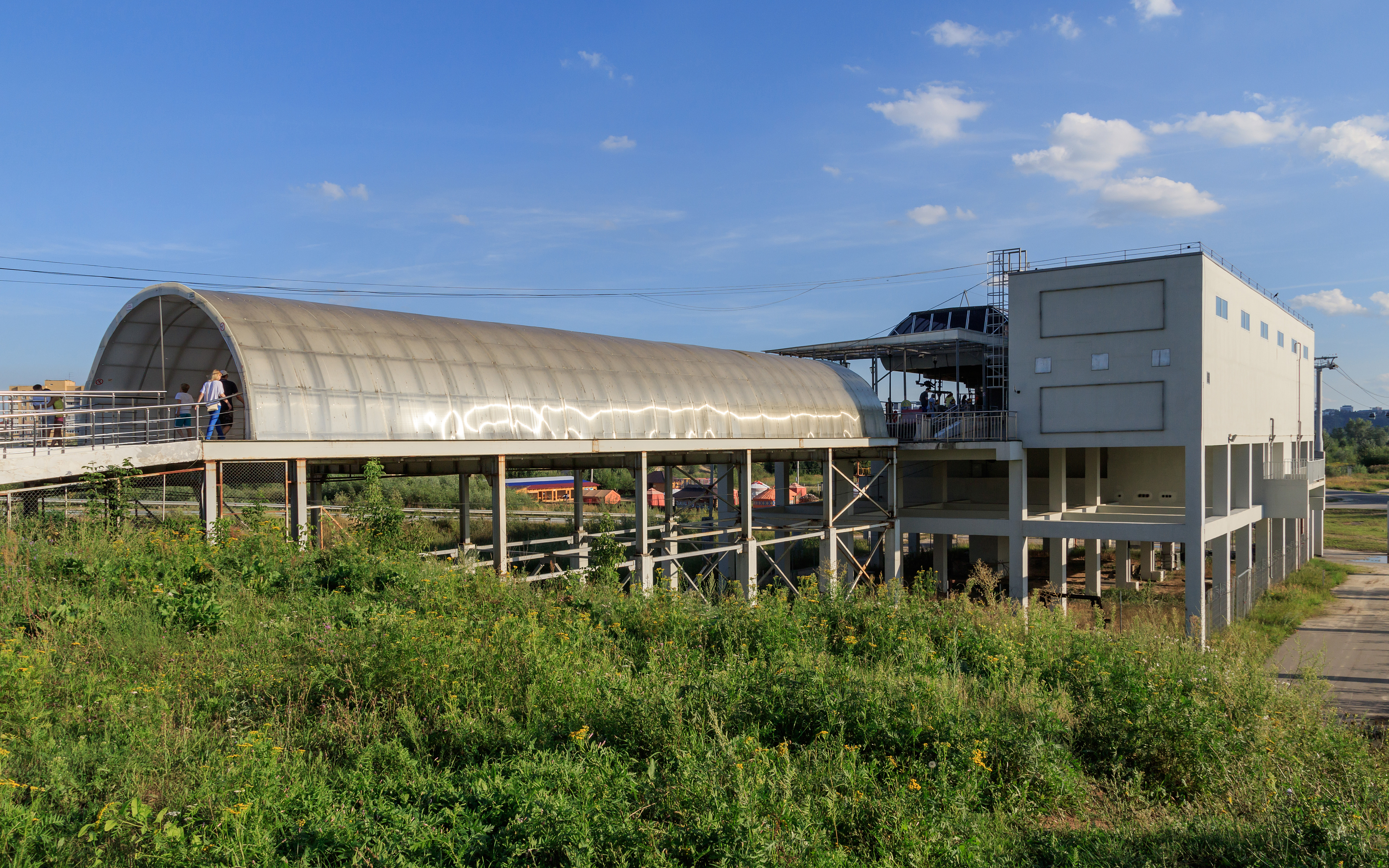
Bor Station

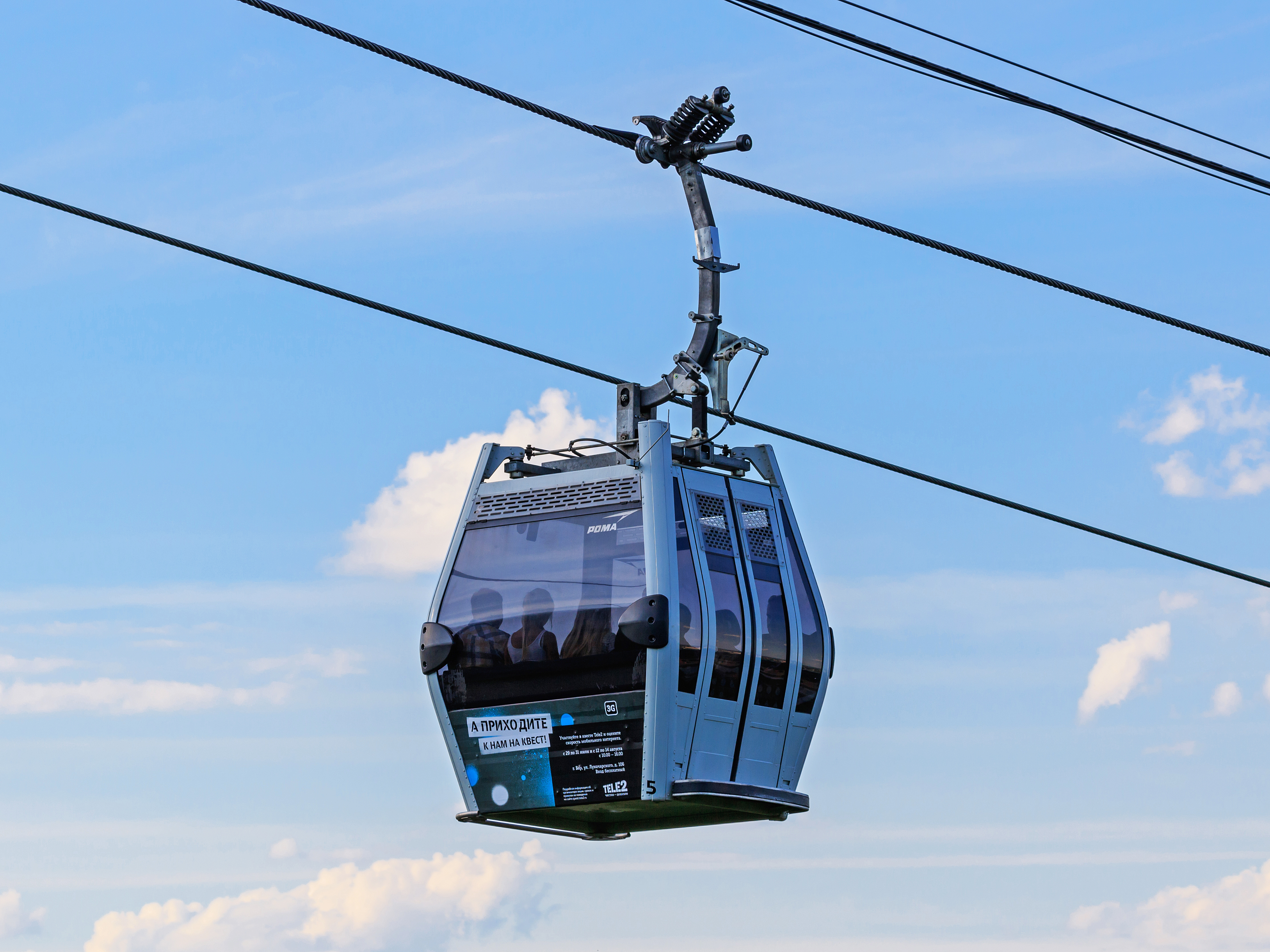
Gondola

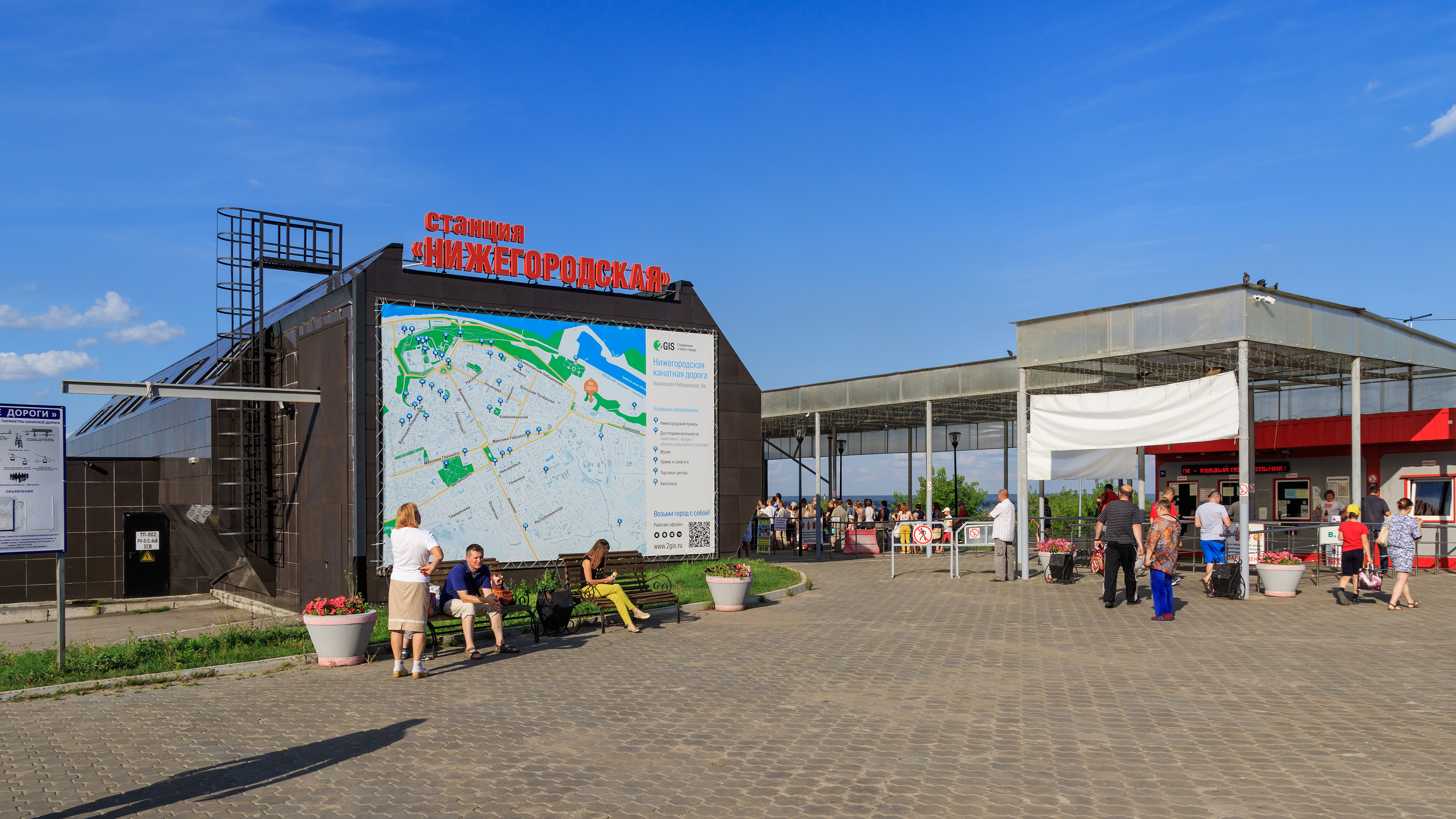
Nizhny Novgorod Station

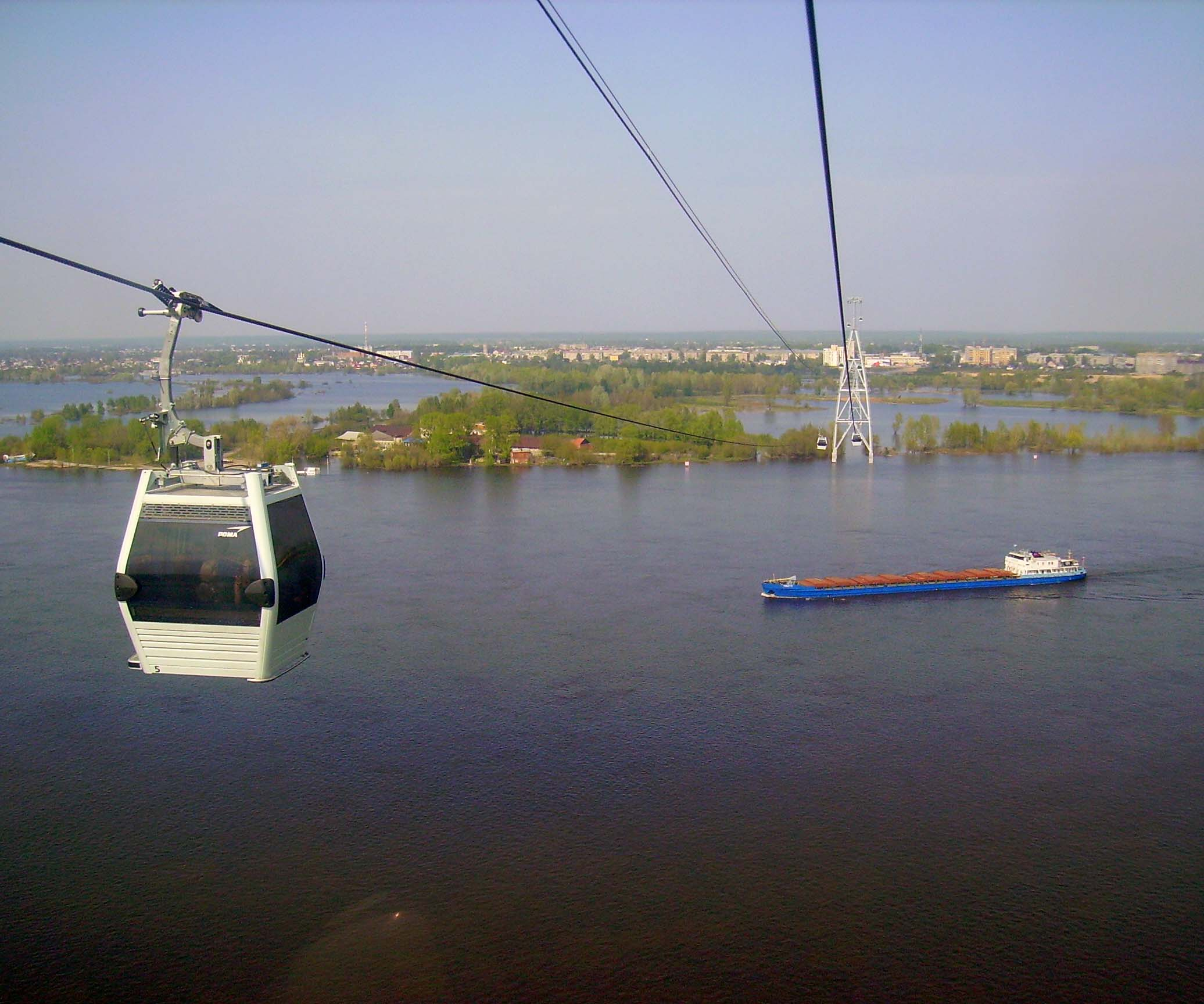
During a flood
