= Korovino, Verkhovazhsky District, Vologda Oblast =

Korovino Коровино
- Village
- Location within Vologda Oblast Location within Russia
- Coordinates: 60°39′N 42°03′E
- Country: Russia
- Region: Vologda Oblast
- District: Verkhovazhsky District
- Time zone: UTC+3:00

Korovino (Russian: Коровино) is a rural locality (a village) in Nizhne-Vazhskoye Rural Settlement, Verkhovazhsky District, Vologda Oblast, Russia. The population was 9 as of 2002.

== Geography ==
Korovino is located 10 km south of Verkhovazhye (the district's administrative centre) by road. Kukolovskaya is the nearest rural locality.
