= Korovino, Moscow =

Coordinates: 55°53′04″N 37°30′46″E

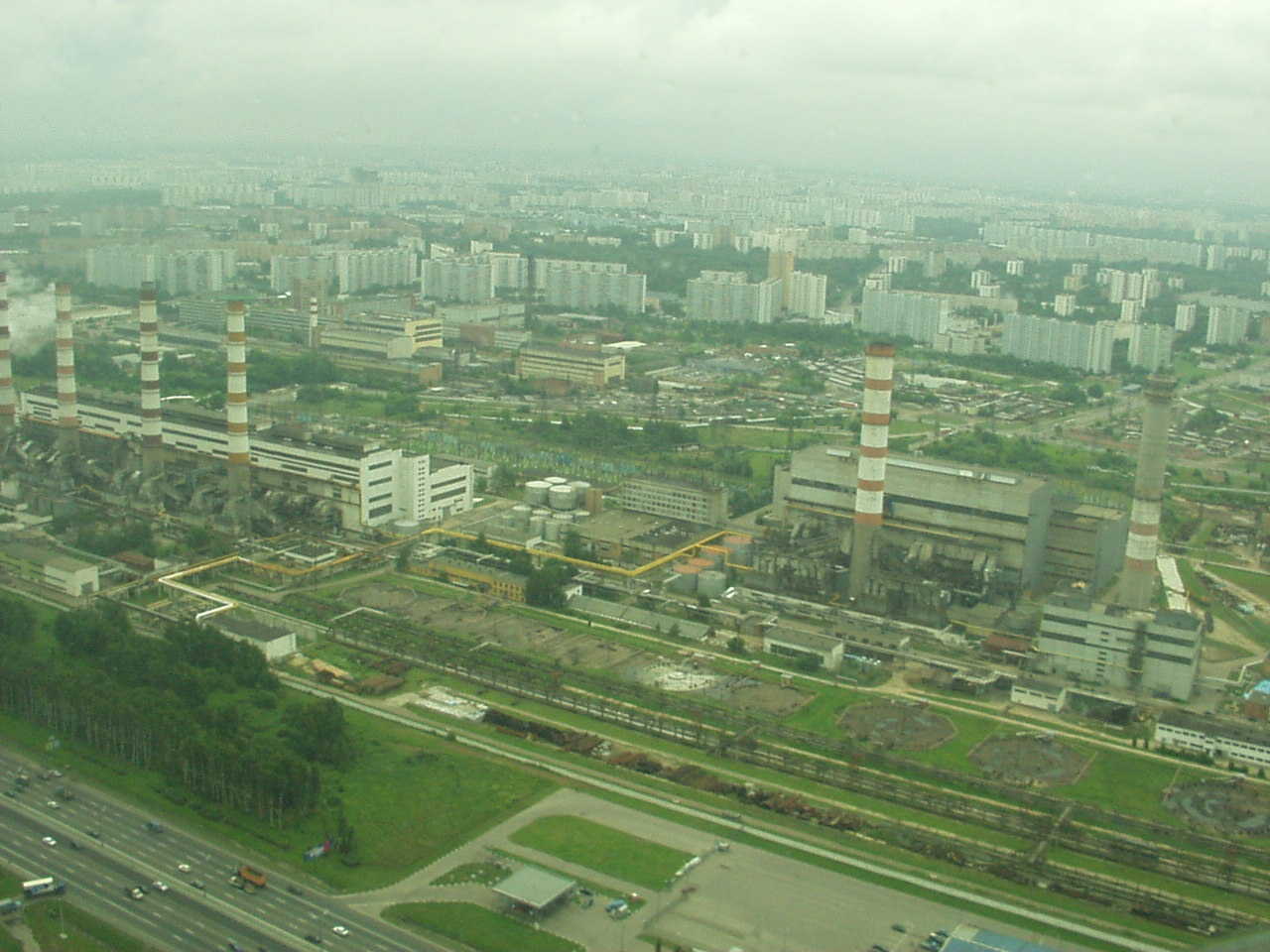
Part of Korovino as seen from MKAD

Korovino is the historical area in the most northern part of Russia's capital city Moscow.

The name means "cow's" and derives from the village of the same name which was known from 16th century and stood there until the 1960s.

Nowadays the territory is included into the Dmitrovsky municipal district of Northern Administrative Okrug.

Two thermal power plants, one being among the biggest in the world, are located in Korovino along territory's adjoining with MKAD.
