= Korovino, Vashkinsky District, Vologda Oblast =

Korovino Коровино
- Village
- Location within Vologda Oblast Location within Russia
- Coordinates: 60°15′N 38°14′E
- Country: Russia
- Region: Vologda Oblast
- District: Vashkinsky District
- Time zone: UTC+3:00

Korovino (Russian: Коровино) is a rural locality (a village) in Vasilyevskoye Rural Settlement, Vashkinsky District, Vologda Oblast, Russia. The population was 4 as of 2002.

== Geography ==
Korovino is located 18 km east of Lipin Bor (the district's administrative centre) by road. Toropunino is the nearest rural locality.
