= Korovino, Melenkovsky District, Vladimir Oblast =

Korovino Коровино
- Selo
- Location within Vladimir Oblast Location within Russia
- Coordinates: 55°22′N 41°30′E
- Country: Russia
- Region: Vladimir Oblast
- District: Melenkovsky District
- Time zone: UTC+3:00

Korovino (Russian: Коро́вино) is a rural locality (a selo) in Danilovskoye Rural Settlement, Melenkovsky District, Vladimir Oblast, Russia. The population was 326 as of 2010. There are 6 streets.

== Geography ==
Korovino is located 11 km (6.8 mi) northwest of Melenki (the district's administrative centre) by road. Ratnovo is the nearest rural locality.
