= Bor, Nizhny Novgorod Oblast =

Town in Nizhny Novgorod Oblast, Russia

Bor Бор
- Town
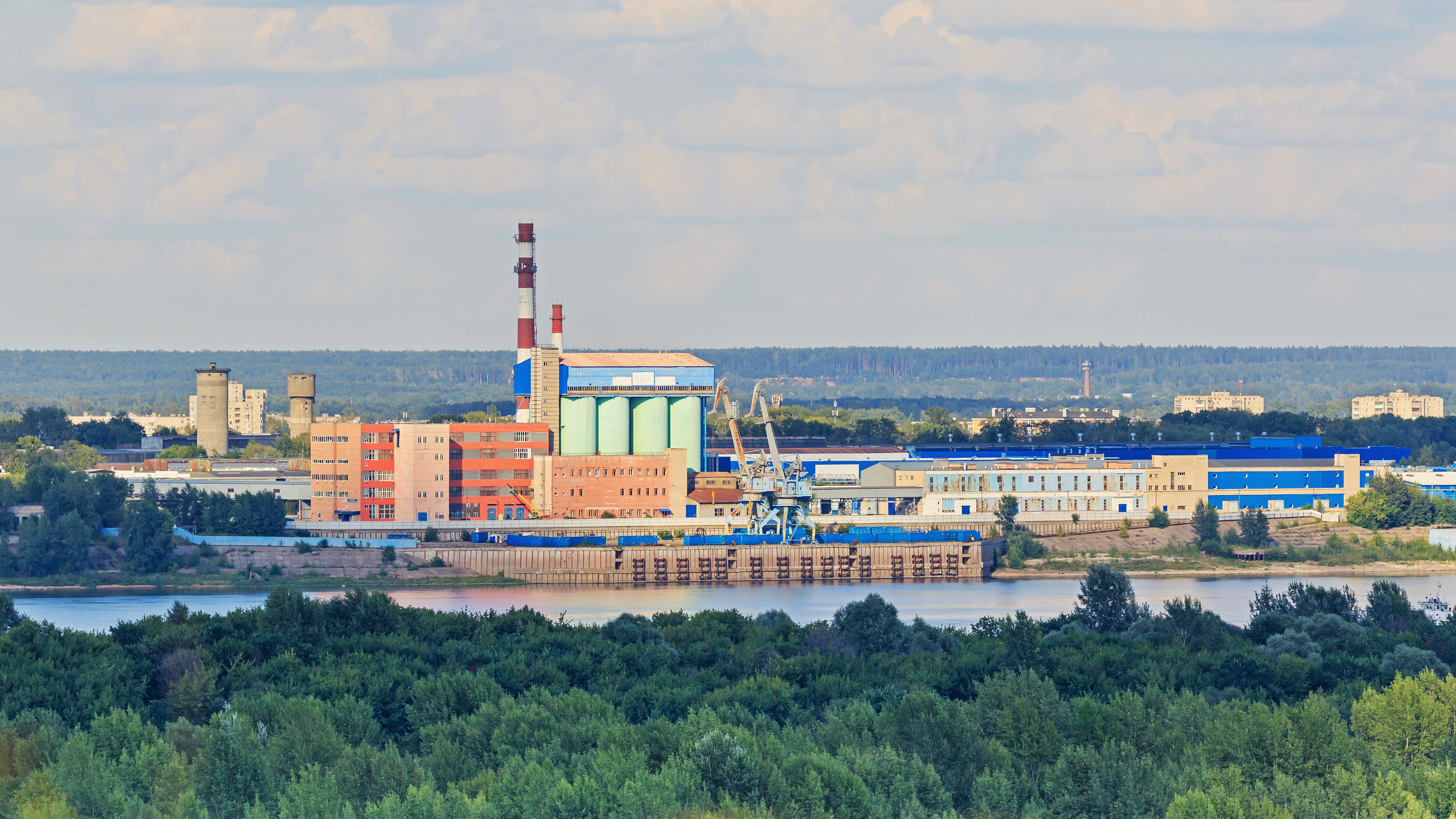
- Bor's riverside industrial area is located directly across the Volga from Nizhny Novgorod, and can be easily seen from there

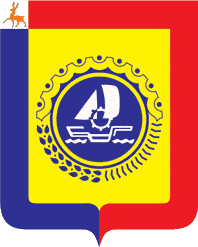
- Coat of arms
- Interactive map of Bor
- Location of Bor Bor (Nizhny Novgorod Oblast)
- Coordinates: 56°21′N 44°05′E
- Country: Russia
- Federal subject: Nizhny Novgorod Oblast
- Founded: 14th century
- Town status since: 1938
- Elevation: 75 m (246 ft)

Population (2010 Census)
  - Total: 78,058
  - Estimate (2025): 77,024 (−1.3%)
  - Rank: 210th in 2010

Administrative status
  - Subordinated to: town of oblast significance of Bor
  - Capital of: town of oblast significance of Bor

Municipal status
  - Urban okrug: Bor Urban Okrug
  - Capital of: Bor Urban Okrug
- Time zone: UTC+3 (MSK)
- Postal code: 606440
- OKTMO ID: 22712000001

Bor (Russian: Бор) is a town in Nizhny Novgorod Oblast, Russia, located on the left (northern) bank of the Volga River, across from Nizhny Novgorod. The two cities are connected by bridges built in 1965 and 2017, and by ferry service. Population: 78,372 (2021 census) 78,058 (2010 census); 61,525 (2002 census); 64,512 (1989 Soviet census); 51,000 (1969).

== History ==
Bor was founded in the 14th century and was granted town status in 1938. In June 2021, an American studying in Nizhny Novgorod was abducted and murdered in Bor.

In early 2008, the Nizhny Novgorod Oblast authorities were discussing the plans for constructing a futuristic "Globe Town" on the low Volga shore opposite Nizhny Novgorod, within Bor's town limits. In March 2008, the Italian architectural firm of Dante O. Benini was chosen as the main designer for the project.

== Administrative and municipal status ==
Within the framework of administrative divisions, it is, together with 300 rural localities, incorporated as the town of oblast significance of Bor—an administrative unit with the status equal to that of the districts. As a municipal division, the town of oblast significance of Bor is incorporated as Bor Urban Okrug.

== Economy ==
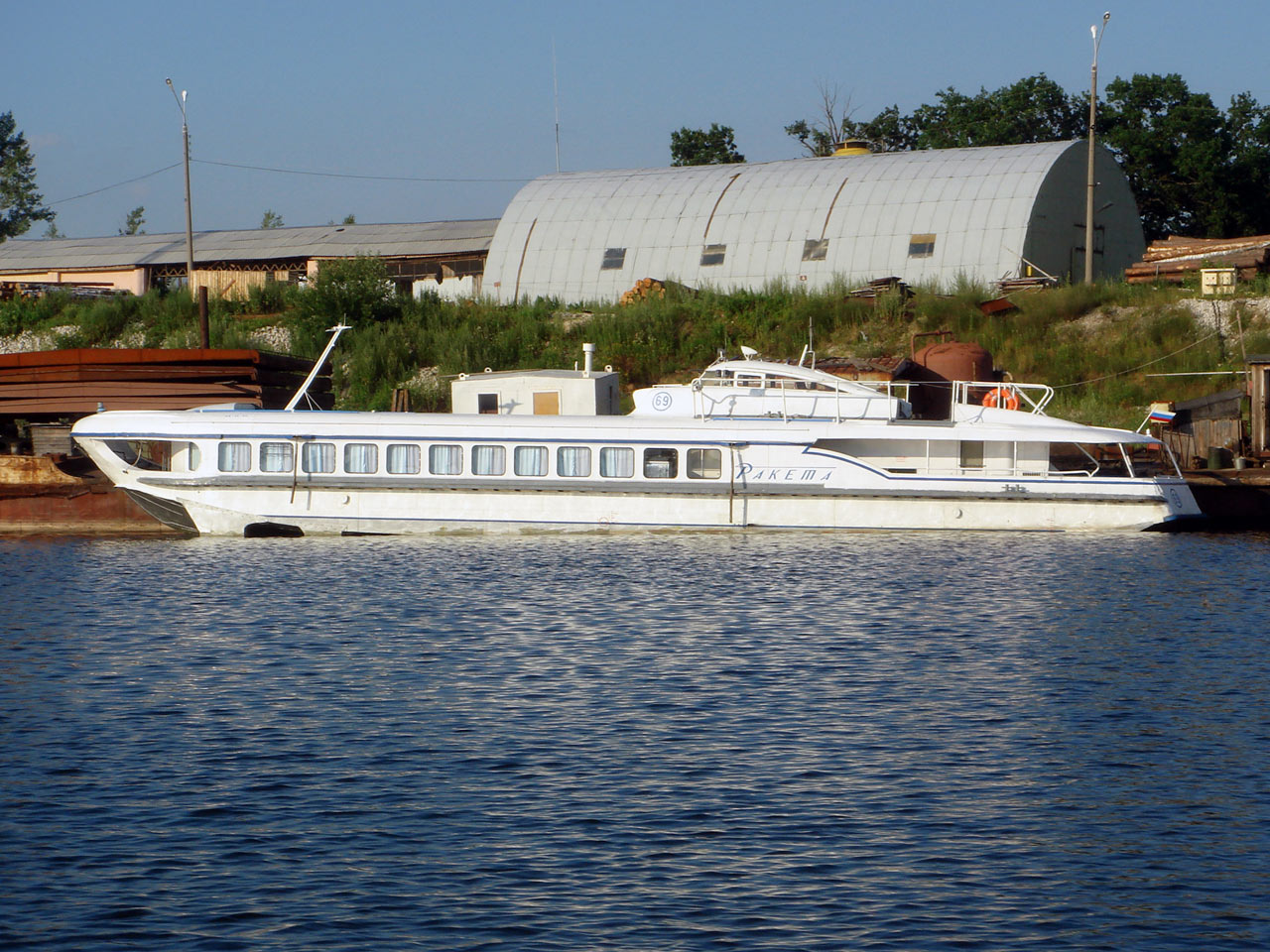
Raketa 69 in Bor

Local industries include shipbuilding (Nizhegorodskiy Teplokhod) and glass-making. The local glass plant, Bor Glass Works, has been manufacturing glass for the GAZ cars and trucks, as well as glassware for table use, since 1934.

== Notable people ==
- Vyacheslav Zudov, cosmonaut
- Eduard Rossel, politician and former governor of Sverdlovsk Oblast
