= Babaninka, Belgorod Oblast =

Babaninka Бабанинка
- Selo
- Location within Belgorod Oblast Location within Russia
- Coordinates: 51°10′N 37°56′E
- Country: Russia
- Region: Belgorod Oblast
- District: Starooskolsky District
- Time zone: UTC+3:00

Babaninka (Russian: Бабанинка) is a rural locality (a selo) in Starooskolsky District, Belgorod Oblast, Russia. The population was 118 as of 2010. There are 2 streets.

== Geography ==
Babaninka is located 23 km southeast of Stary Oskol (the district's administrative centre) by road. Gotovye is the nearest rural locality.
