= Verkhne-Chufichevoe =

Verkhne-Chufichevoe Верхне-Чуфичево
- Selo
- Location within Belgorod Oblast Location within Russia
- Coordinates: 51°13′N 37°43′E
- Country: Russia
- Region: Belgorod Oblast
- District: Starooskolsky District
- Time zone: UTC+3:00

Verkhne-Chufichevoe (Russian: Верхне-Чуфичево) is a rural locality (a selo) in Starooskolsky District, Belgorod Oblast, Russia. The population was 183 as of 2010. There are 4 streets.

== Geography ==
Verkhne-Chufichevoe is located 16 km southwest of Stary Oskol (the district's administrative centre) by road. Kotenevka is the nearest rural locality.
