= Rogovatoye =

Rogovatoye Роговатое
- Selo
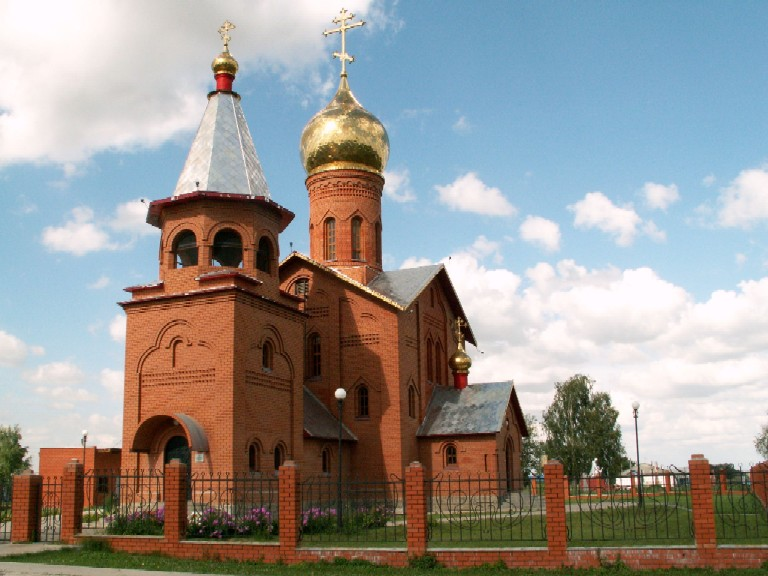
- Church in Rogovatoye

- Location within Belgorod Oblast Location within Russia
- Coordinates: 51°13′N 38°22′E
- Country: Russia
- Region: Belgorod Oblast
- District: Starooskolsky District
- Time zone: UTC+3:00

Rogovatoye (Russian: Рогова́тое) is a rural locality (a selo) and the administrative center of Rogovatovskoye Rural Settlement, Starooskolsky District, Belgorod Oblast, Russia. The population was 3,001 as of 2010. There are 37 streets.

== Geography ==
Rogovatoye is located 47 km east of Stary Oskol (the district's administrative centre) by road. Dmitriyevsky is the nearest rural locality.
