= Nizhneatamanskoye =

Nizhneatamanskoye Нижнеатаманское
- Selo
- Location within Belgorod Oblast Location within Russia
- Coordinates: 51°12′N 37°51′E
- Country: Russia
- Region: Belgorod Oblast
- District: Starooskolsky District
- Time zone: UTC+3:00

Nizhneatamanskoye (Russian: Нижнеатаманское) is a rural locality (a selo) in Starooskolsky District, Belgorod Oblast, Russia. The population was 156 as of 2010. There are 9 streets.

== Geography ==
Nizhneatamanskoye is located 12 km south of Stary Oskol (the district's administrative centre) by road. Sorokino is the nearest rural locality.
