= Okolnoye =

Okolnoye Окольное
- Selo
- Location within Belgorod Oblast Location within Russia
- Coordinates: 51°08′N 37°45′E
- Country: Russia
- Region: Belgorod Oblast
- District: Starooskolsky District
- Time zone: UTC+3:00

Okolnoye (Russian: Окольное) is a rural locality (a selo) in Starooskolsky District, Belgorod Oblast, Russia. The population was 144 as of 2010. There are 2 streets.

== Geography ==
Okolnoye is located 24 km southwest of Stary Oskol (the district's administrative centre) by road. Dolgaya Polyana is the nearest rural locality.
