= Khoroshilovo =

Khoroshilovo Хорошилово
- Selo
- Location within Belgorod Oblast Location within Russia
- Coordinates: 51°16′N 38°04′E
- Country: Russia
- Region: Belgorod Oblast
- District: Starooskolsky District
- Time zone: UTC+3:00

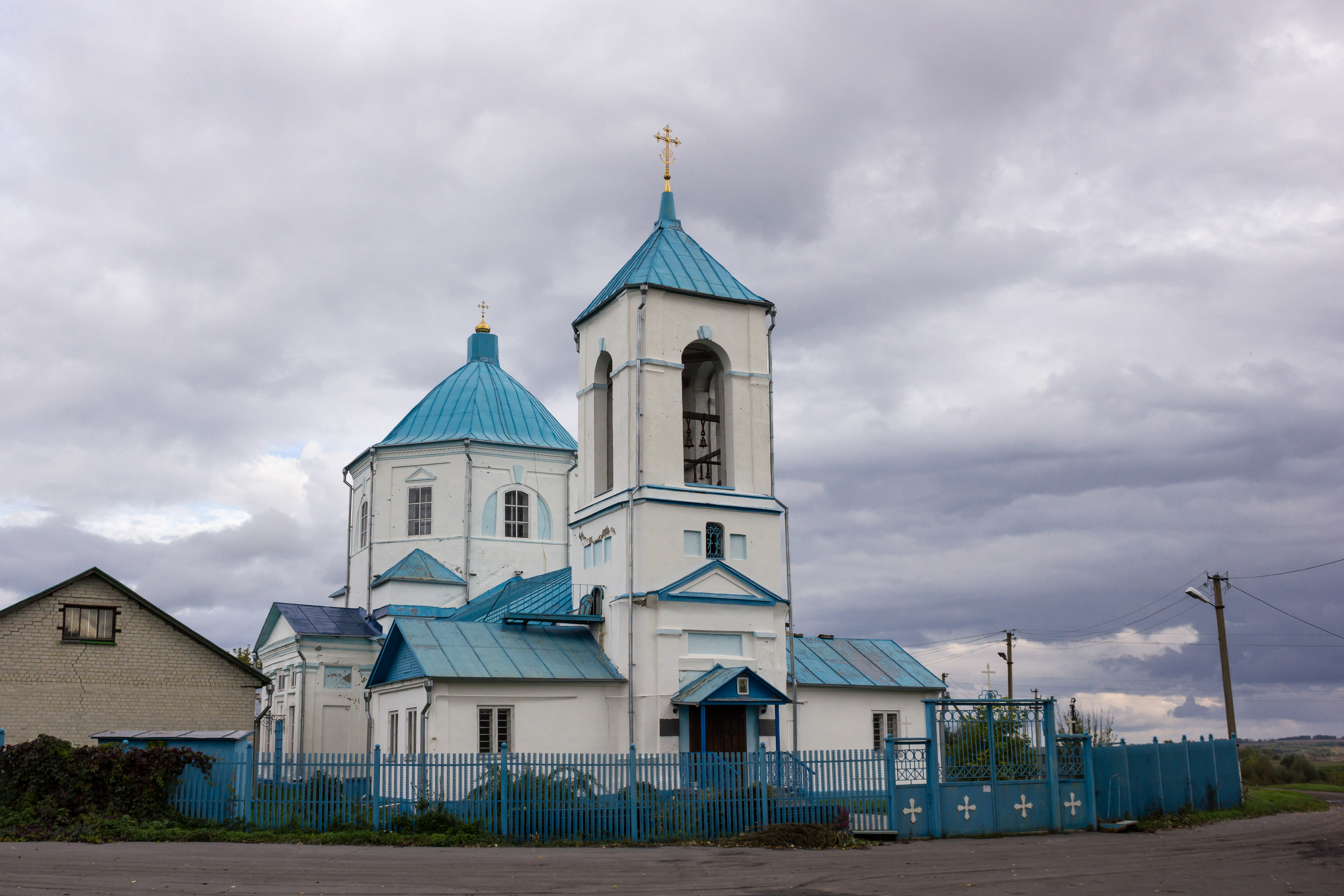
Church of St. Demetrius, Khoroshilovo

Khoroshilovo (Russian: Хорошилово) is a rural locality (a selo) in Starooskolsky District, Belgorod Oblast, Russia. The population was 436 as of 2010. There are 14 streets.

== Geography ==
Khoroshilovo is located 23 km southeast of Stary Oskol (the district's administrative centre) by road. Arkhangelskoye is the nearest rural locality.
