= Potudan =

Potudan Потудань
- Selo
- Location within Belgorod Oblast Location within Russia
- Coordinates: 51°16′N 38°14′E
- Country: Russia
- Region: Belgorod Oblast
- District: Starooskolsky District
- Time zone: UTC+3:00

Potudan (Russian: Потудань) is a rural locality (a selo) and the administrative center of Potudanskoye Rural Settlement, Starooskolsky District, Belgorod Oblast, Russia. The population was 493 as of 2010. There are 11 streets.

== Geography ==
Potudan is located 36 km east of Stary Oskol (the district's administrative centre) by road. Logvinovka is the nearest rural locality.
