= Vorotnikovo =

Vorotnikovo Воротниково
- Selo
- Location within Belgorod Oblast Location within Russia
- Coordinates: 51°17′N 37°56′E
- Country: Russia
- Region: Belgorod Oblast
- District: Starooskolsky District
- Time zone: UTC+3:00

Vorotnikovo (Russian: Воротниково) is a rural locality (a selo) in Starooskolsky District, Belgorod Oblast, Russia. The population was 254 as of 2010. There are 5 streets.

== Geography ==
Vorotnikovo is located 11 km southeast of Stary Oskol (the district's administrative centre) by road. Neznamovo is the nearest rural locality.
