= Nabokino =

Nabokino Набокино
- Settlement
- Location within Belgorod Oblast Location within Russia
- Coordinates: 51°22′N 37°53′E
- Country: Russia
- Region: Belgorod Oblast
- District: Starooskolsky District
- Time zone: UTC+3:00

Nabokino (Russian: Набокино) is a rural locality (a settlement) in Starooskolsky District, Belgorod Oblast, Russia. The population was 135 as of 2010. There are 7 streets.

== Geography ==
Nabokino is located 14 km north of Stary Oskol (the district's administrative centre) by road. Novokladovoye is the nearest rural locality.
