= Novaya Derevnya, Starooskolsky District, Belgorod Oblast =

Novaya Derevnya Новая Деревня
- Settlement
- Location within Belgorod Oblast Location within Russia
- Coordinates: 51°06′N 37°47′E
- Country: Russia
- Region: Belgorod Oblast
- District: Starooskolsky District
- Time zone: UTC+3:00

Novaya Derevnya (Russian: Новая Деревня) is a rural locality (a settlement) in Starooskolsky District, Belgorod Oblast, Russia. The population was 35 as of 2010. There is 1 street.

== Geography ==
Novaya Derevnya is located 29 km south of Stary Oskol (the district's administrative centre) by road. Prioskolye is the nearest rural locality.
