= Kazachok, Belgorod Oblast =

Kazachok Казачок
- Selo
- Location within Belgorod Oblast Location within Russia
- Coordinates: 51°06′N 37°53′E
- Country: Russia
- Region: Belgorod Oblast
- District: Starooskolsky District
- Time zone: UTC+3:00

Kazachok (Russian: Казачок) is a rural locality (a selo) and the administrative center of Kazachenskoye Rural Settlement, Starooskolsky District, Belgorod Oblast, Russia. The population was 486 as of 2010. There are 9 streets.

== Geography ==
Kazachok is located 34 km south of Stary Oskol (the district's administrative centre) by road. Golofeyevka is the nearest rural locality.
