= Bocharovka =

Bocharovka Бочаровка
- Selo
- Location within Belgorod Oblast Location within Russia
- Coordinates: 51°20′N 38°01′E
- Country: Russia
- Region: Belgorod Oblast
- District: Starooskolsky District
- Time zone: UTC+3:00

Bocharovka (Russian: Бочаровка) is a rural locality (a selo) in Starooskolsky District, Belgorod Oblast, Russia. The population was 56 as of 2010. There are 3 streets.

== Geography ==
Bocharovka is located 17 km northeast of Stary Oskol (the district's administrative centre) by road. Chumaki is the nearest rural locality.
