= Chernikovo =

Chernikovo Черниково
- Selo
- Location within Belgorod Oblast Location within Russia
- Coordinates: 51°13′N 38°00′E
- Country: Russia
- Region: Belgorod Oblast
- District: Starooskolsky District
- Time zone: UTC+3:00

Chernikovo (Russian: Черниково) is a rural locality (a selo) in Starooskolsky District, Belgorod Oblast, Russia. The population was 245 as of 2010. There are 14 streets.

== Geography ==
Chernikovo is located 21 km southeast of Stary Oskol (the district's administrative centre) by road. Ozerki is the nearest rural locality.
