= Novosyolovka, Starooskolsky District, Belgorod Oblast =

Novosyolovka Новосёловка
- Selo
- Location within Belgorod Oblast Location within Russia
- Coordinates: 51°17′N 37°44′E
- Country: Russia
- Region: Belgorod Oblast
- District: Starooskolsky District
- Time zone: UTC+3:00

Novosyolovka (Russian: Новосёловка) is a rural locality (a selo) in Starooskolsky District, Belgorod Oblast, Russia. The population was 241 as of 2010. There are 5 streets.

== Geography ==
Novosyolovka is located 7 km west of Stary Oskol (the district's administrative centre) by road. Yezdotsky is the nearest rural locality.
