= Terekhovo, Starooskolsky District, Belgorod Oblast =

Terekhovo Терехово
- Selo
- Location within Belgorod Oblast Location within Russia
- Coordinates: 51°20′N 38°03′E
- Country: Russia
- Region: Belgorod Oblast
- District: Starooskolsky District
- Time zone: UTC+3:00

Terekhovo (Russian: Терехово) is a rural locality (a selo) in Starooskolsky District, Belgorod Oblast, Russia. The population was 434 as of 2010. There are 15 streets.

== Geography ==
Terekhovo is located 21 km northeast of Stary Oskol (the district's administrative centre) by road. Kotovo is the nearest rural locality.
