= Soldatskoye, Starooskolsky District, Belgorod Oblast =

Soldatskoye Солдатское
- Selo
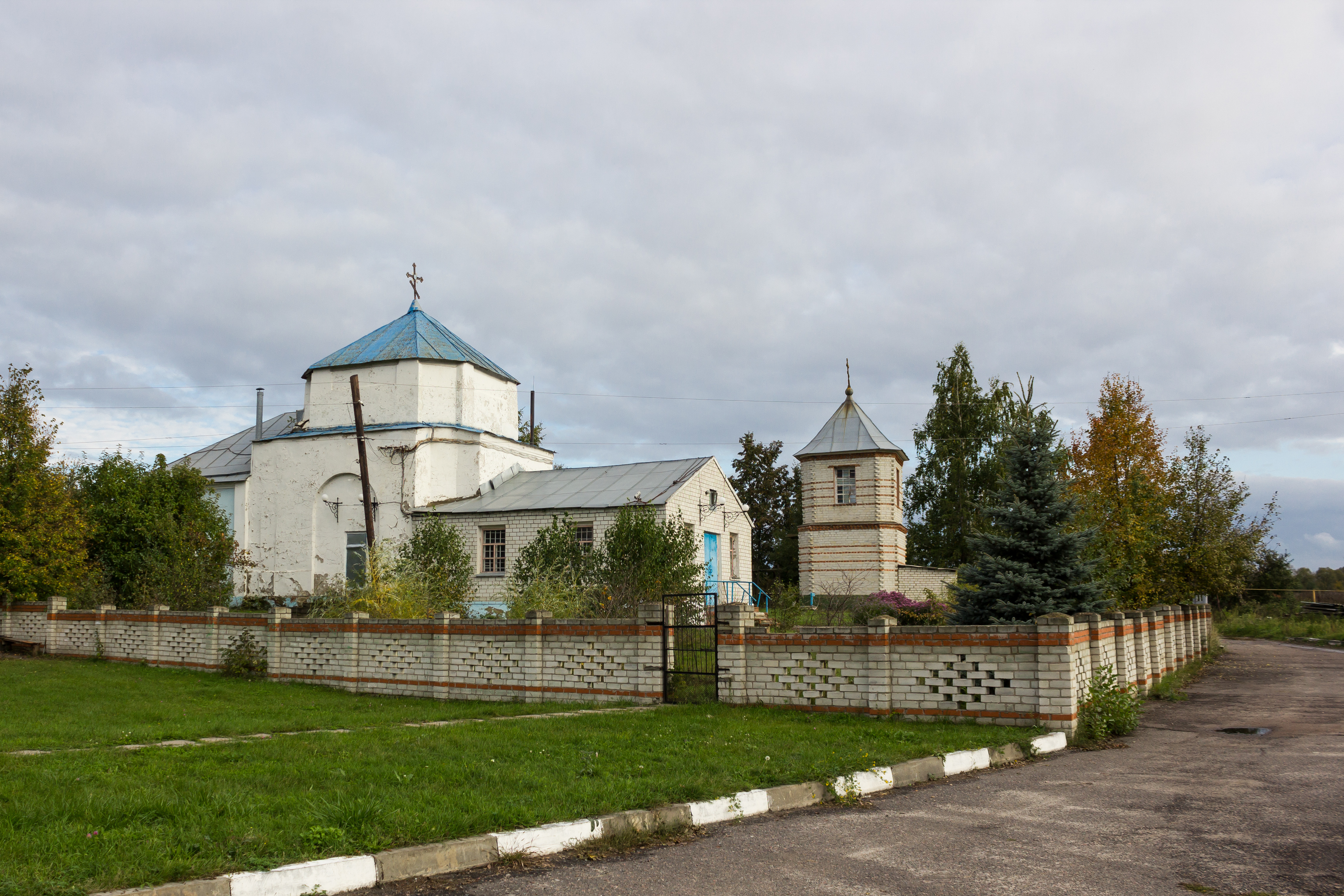
- Church of the Nativity of Christ (Belgorod Region, Stary Oskol District, Soldatskoye Village)

- Location within Belgorod Oblast Location within Russia
- Coordinates: 51°09′N 38°07′E
- Country: Russia
- Region: Belgorod Oblast
- District: Starooskolsky District
- Time zone: UTC+3:00

Soldatskoye (Russian: Солдáтское) is a rural locality (a selo) and the administrative center of Soldatskoye Rural Settlement, Starooskolsky District, Belgorod Oblast, Russia. The population was 1,269 as of 2010. There are 34 streets.

== Geography ==
Soldatskoye is located 36 km southeast of Stary Oskol (the district's administrative centre) by road. Gudayevka is the nearest rural locality.
