= Nizhne-Chufichevo =

Nizhne-Chufichevo Нижне-Чуфичево
- Selo
- Location within Belgorod Oblast Location within Russia
- Coordinates: 51°11′N 37°51′E
- Country: Russia
- Region: Belgorod Oblast
- District: Starooskolsky District
- Time zone: UTC+3:00

Nizhne-Chufichevo (Russian: Нижне-Чуфичево) is a rural locality (a selo) in Starooskolsky District, Belgorod Oblast, Russia. The population was 120 as of 2010. There are 4 streets.

== Geography ==
Nizhne-Chufichevo is located 16 km south of Stary Oskol (the district's administrative centre) by road. Veliky Perevoz is the nearest rural locality.
