= RA1 (based on ZIL-158V) =

Soviet railcar based on a bus model

RA1 based on ZIL-158V
- Stock type: Two-car railcar
- Manufacturer: "Krasny Put"
- Constructed: 1962
- Number built: 1

Specifications
- Train length: 9,030 millimetres (29 ft 8 in) (length of one car without couplers)
- Wheel diameter: 1,050 millimetres (3 ft 5 in)
- Prime mover: ZIL-158V
- Engine type: Six-cylinder four-stroke carburetor gasoline engine
- Power output: 2 x 109 hp (2 x 81.3 kW)
- Track gauge: 1,524 mm (5 ft)

RA1 (Russian: РА1) is a two-car passenger railcar (railbus), built on the basis of two ZIL-158V city buses.

== Description ==
The railcar was meant for transporting track workers on lightly used lines. The project was prepared by the bureau of the Main Directorate of Tracks and Structures of the Ministry of Railways, under the leadership of the bureau's chief designer, I. A. Burovtsev. The ZIL-158V bus, produced from 1961 to 1970, was chosen as the basis for the rail transport.

The railcar was built from two city buses, with their rear ends connected by a couper. When moving, the front car became the leading (motor) car, and the rear one was the driven car. The buses' own wheels were replaced with steel wheels 1,050 mm (3 ft 5 in) in diameter, set to a track width of 1,524 mm (5.000 ft) instead of the original 2,116 mm (6 ft 11.3 in) in the front and 1,806 mm (5 ft 11.1 in) in the back. Another door was installed on the left side at the rear of each bus. Additional equipment also included a sandbox.

A prototype of the railcar was prepared at the Krasny Put factory in mid-1962. It was sent for testing at the experimental track at VNIIZhT in the department of diesel locomotives and locomotive facilities. The tests showed that when in motion, the wheel hubs of the railcar, which didn’t have a rigid connection or pneumatic isolation, experienced increased loads both laterally and longitudinally. Impact forces caused the bolts to loosen, vibrations appeared on the body, and the lateral movements increased. These issues led the testing commission to give a negative conclusion due to safety requirements not being met, and the railcar was denied approval for service. At the same time, it was noted that further testing was pointless.
