= Starooskolsky =

Starooskolsky (masculine), Starooksolskaya (feminine), or Starooskolskoye (neuter) may refer to:

- Starooskolsky District, a district of Belgorod Oblast, Russia
- Starooskolsky Urban Okrug, a municipal formation in Belgorod Oblast, Russia
