= LiAZ (Russia) =

Russian bus manufacturing company

LiAZ (Likino Bus Plant)
- Native name: Ликинский автобусный завод
- Industry: Bus manufacturing
- Founded: 1937
- Headquarters: Likino-Dulyovo, Moscow Oblast, Russia
- Products: Buses, trolleybuses (2005–2012)
- Revenue: $243 million (2017)
- Operating income: $6.06 million (2017)
- Net income: −$4.76 million (2017)
- Total assets: $244 million (2017)
- Total equity: $58.2 million (2017)
- Number of employees: 2,061
- Parent: GAZ Group Bus Division
- Website: bus.ru

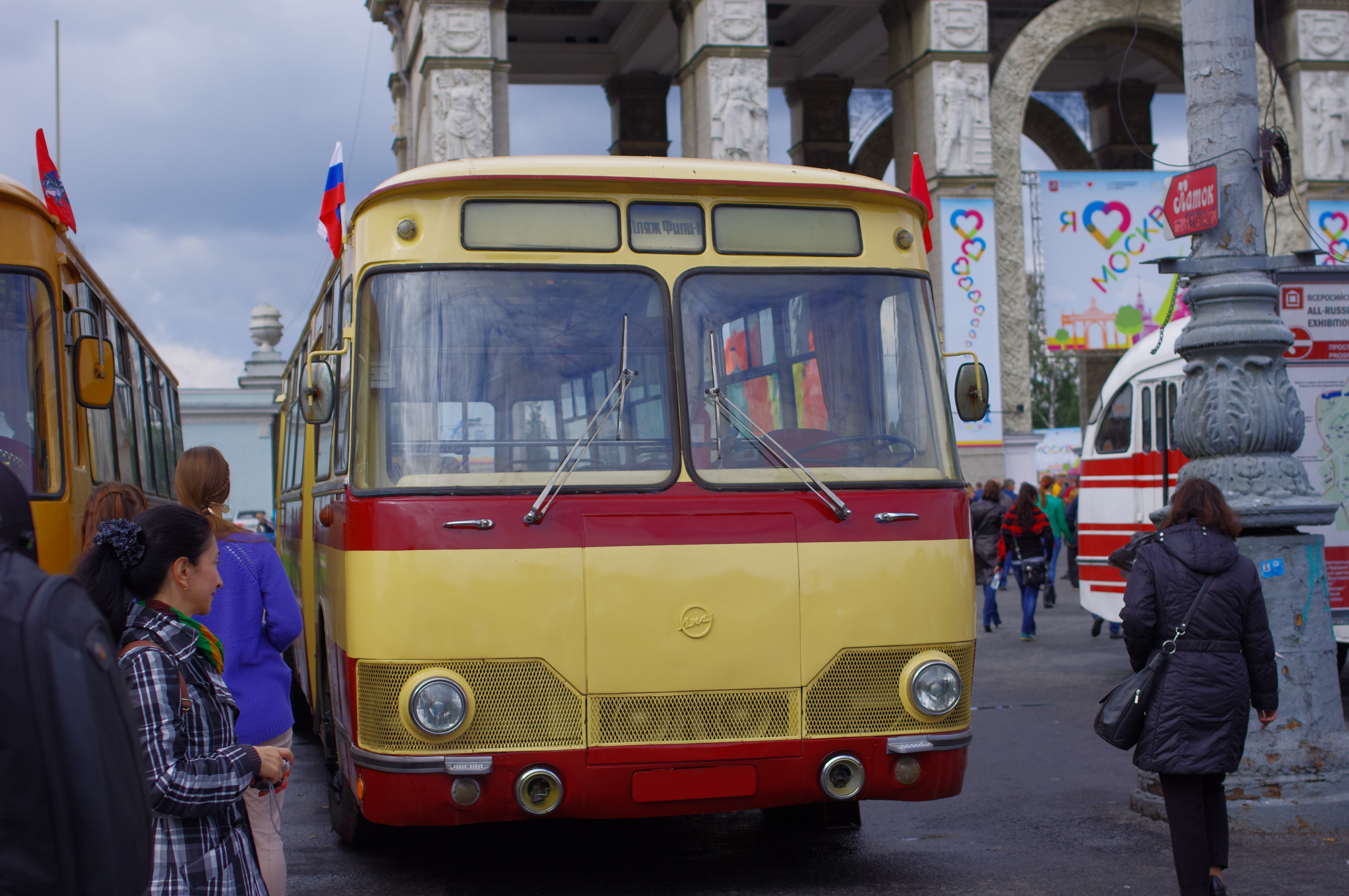
A LiAZ-677 in Moscow

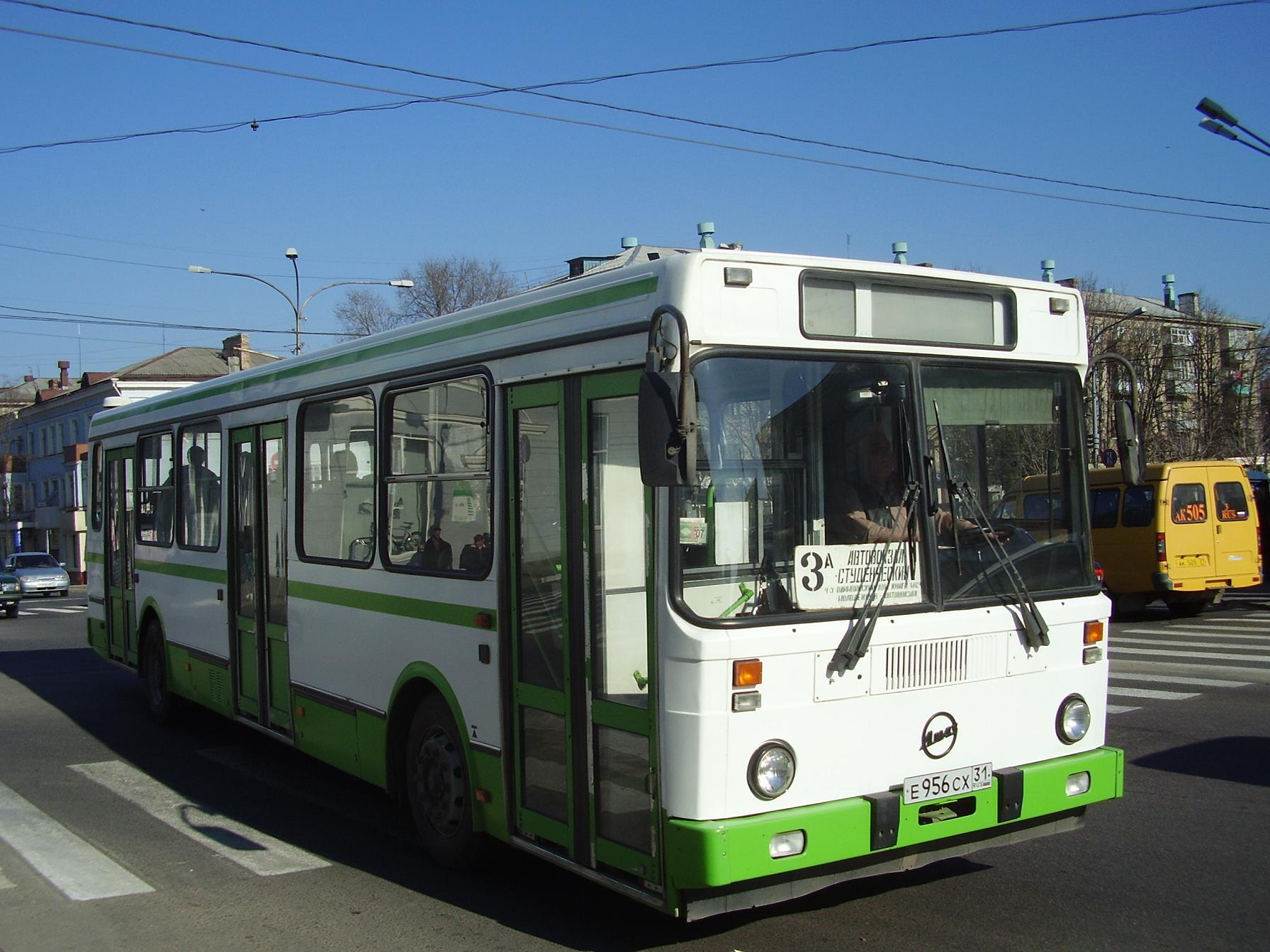
LiAZ-5256 bus (first generation, pre 2005) in Stary Oskol (Belgorod Oblast)

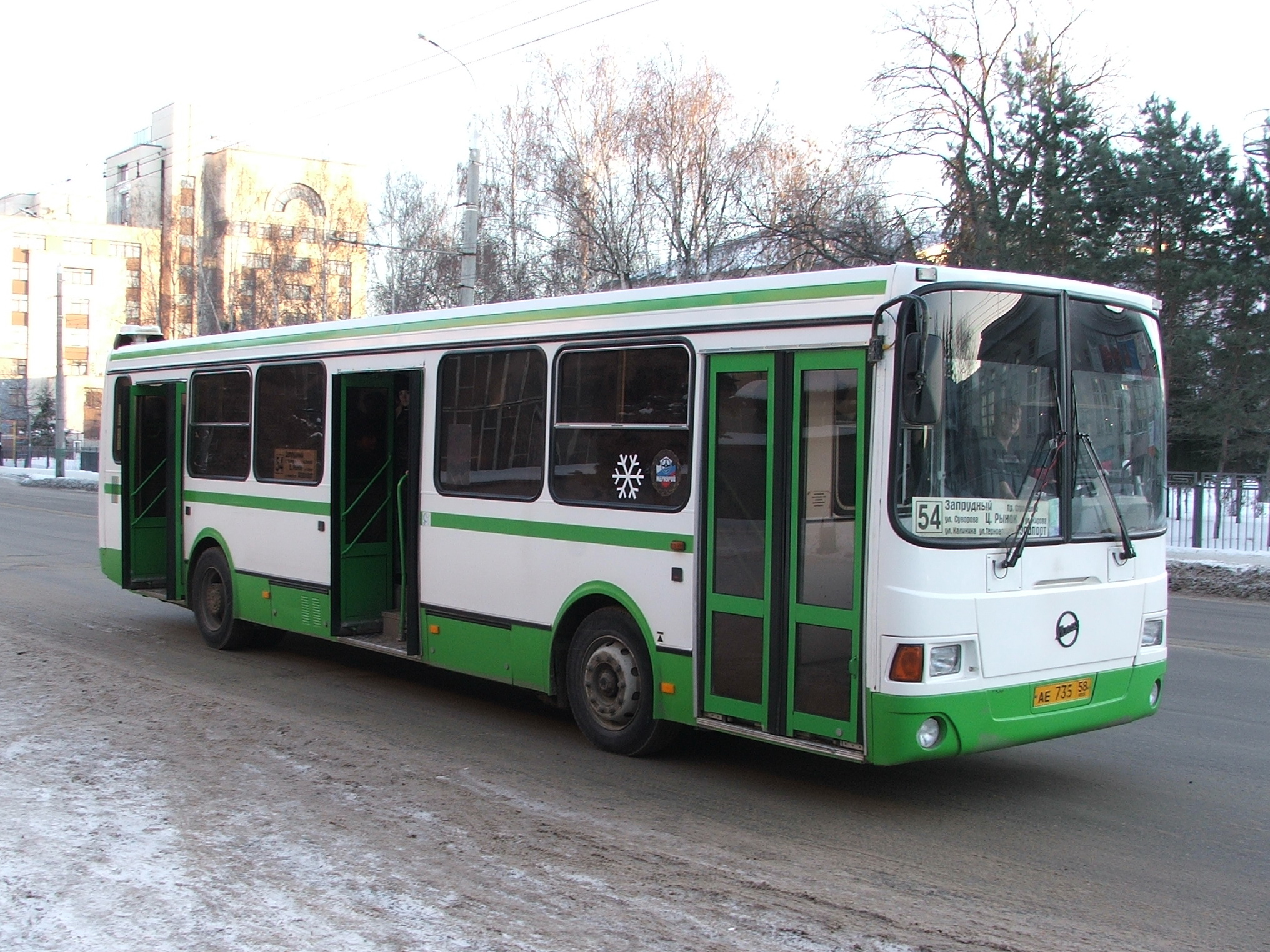
LiAZ-5256 bus (second generation) in Penza

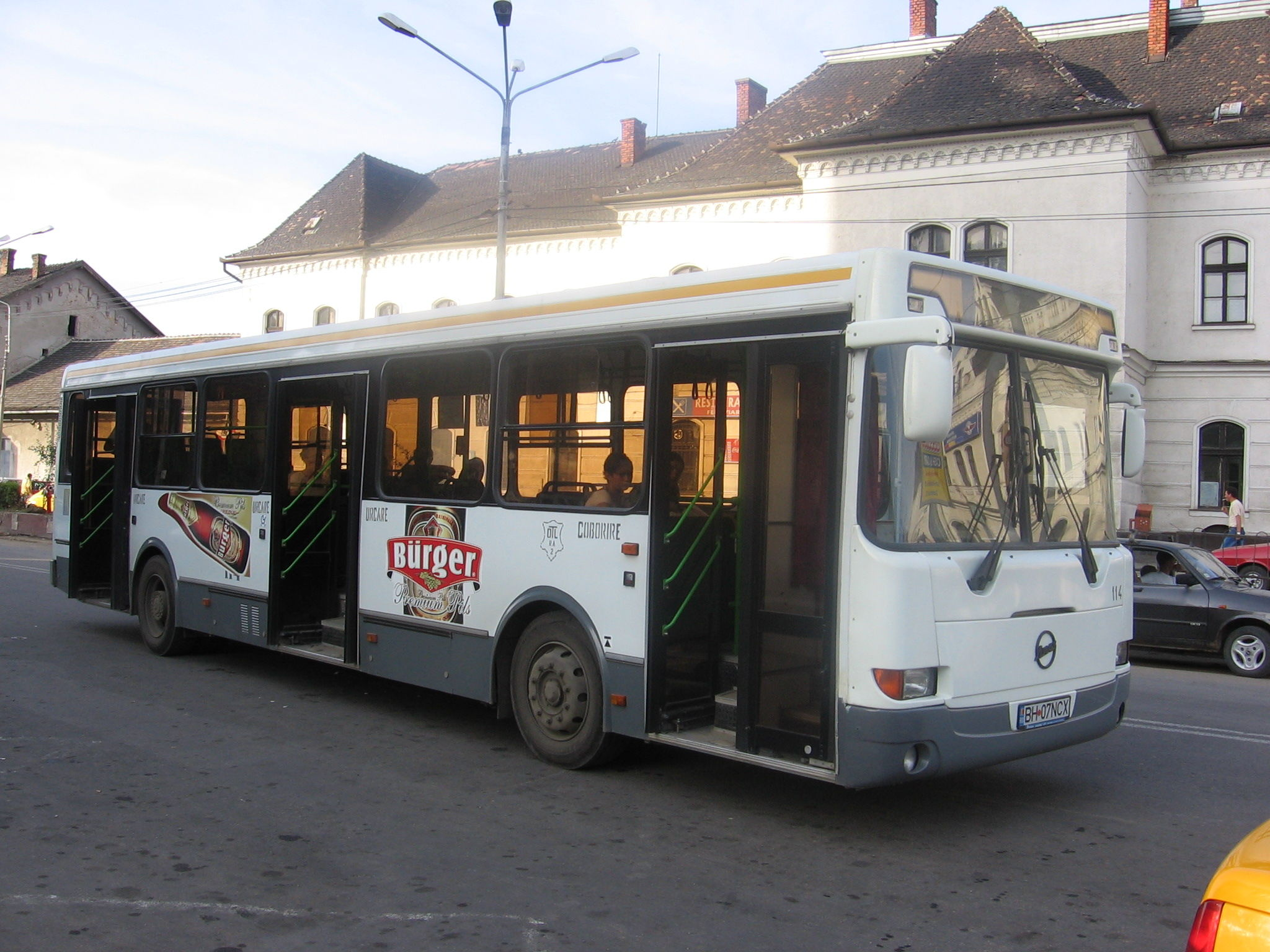
LiAZ-5256 bus (second generation) in Oradea (Romania)

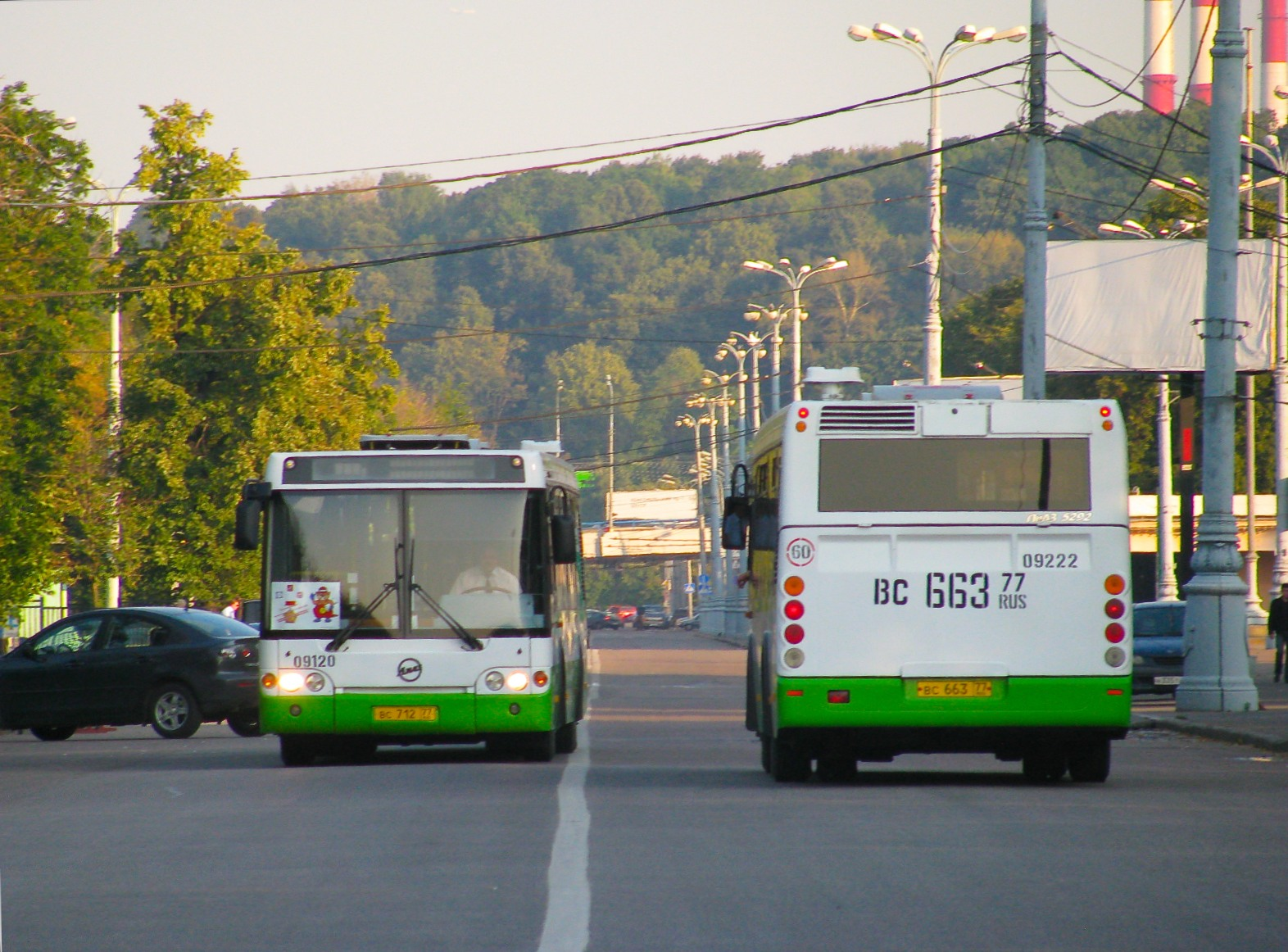
Two LiAZ-5292.20 buses in Moscow

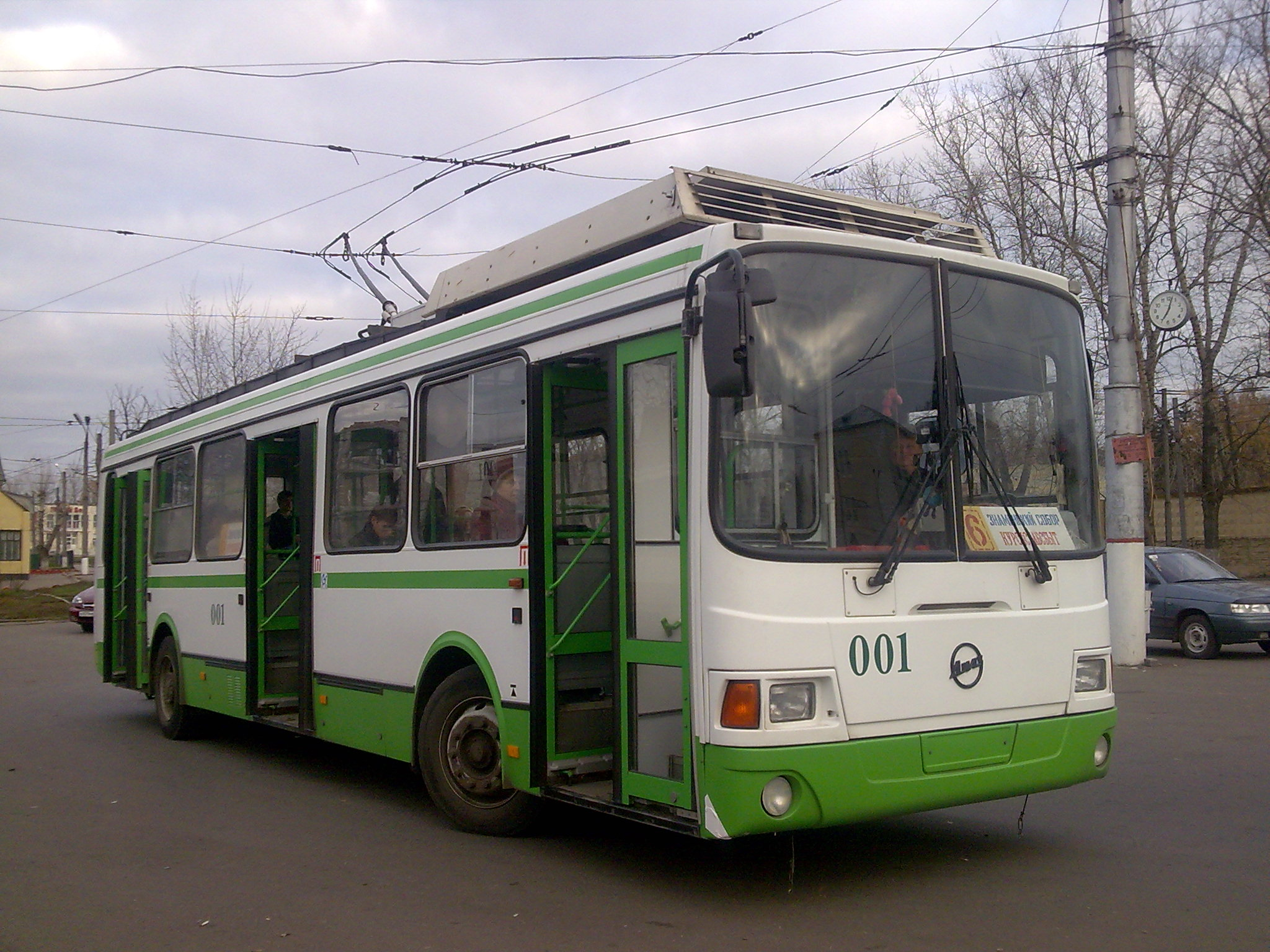
LiAZ-5280 trolleybus in Kursk

LiAZ (Russian: Ликинский автобусный завод (ЛиАЗ), romanized: Likinskiy Avtobusnyi Zavod, lit. 'Likino Bus Plant') is a bus manufacturing company located in Likino-Dulyovo, Russia. It is now a wholly owned subsidiary of GAZ. Specializes in designing and manufacturing buses large and extra large class (length 10.5 m and +).

Starting in 2015, the GAZ Group has introduced a single brand for all its bus manufacturing subsidiaries, and newly manufactured vehicles now feature the deer badge of the GAZ company.

== History ==
The factory was created in 1937 as a wood processing plant LOZOD (Likino Engineered Wood Test Factory). It produced pressed wood products, as well as wood particle boards. In 1944 the factory was renamed to LiMZ (Likino Machinery Factory) and it started producing small machinery like power saws and portable generators.

In 1959 the factory started to assemble ZIL-158 passenger buses. It was renamed LiAZ the same year. In 1967 the factory designed and began manufacturing the first bus model of its own named LiAZ-677. The factory produced 194,183 buses of this model in the next 29 years.

In 1986 began the production of the new model LiAZ-5256, which today is the most common large bus model in Russia (through December 2013 more than 24,650 buses had been manufactured).

After the collapse of the Soviet Union, LiAZ started to experience difficulties. In 1996 bus manufacturing ceased and the factory declared bankruptcy in 1997. The factory has since been restructured and is now known as Likinskij Avtobusnyj Zavod LLC. In 2000 it was acquired by the RusAvtoProm Corporation, and has been part of the GAZ Group since 2005.

LiAZ also manufactured trolleybuses between 2005 and 2012.

== Models ==
=== Buses ===
==== Historical ====
- ZIL-158/LiAZ-158 (1959–1970), front-engined bus
- LiAZ-677 (1967–1996), front-engined bus with automatic transmission
- LiAZ-5256 (1986–2021)
- LiAZ-5293 (2006–2021)
- LiAZ-5917 (1989–1992)
- LiAZ-5918 (1989–1992)
- LiAZ-6212 (2002–2014)
- LiAZ-6220 (1992), articulated trolleybus based on LiAZ-5256
- LiAZ-6224 (2004–2005)
- LiAZ-6234 (2008), articulated trolleybus based on LiAZ-6213
- LiAZ-6240 (1994), articulated based on LiAZ-5256
- LiAZ-6274 (2012–2019) electric bus
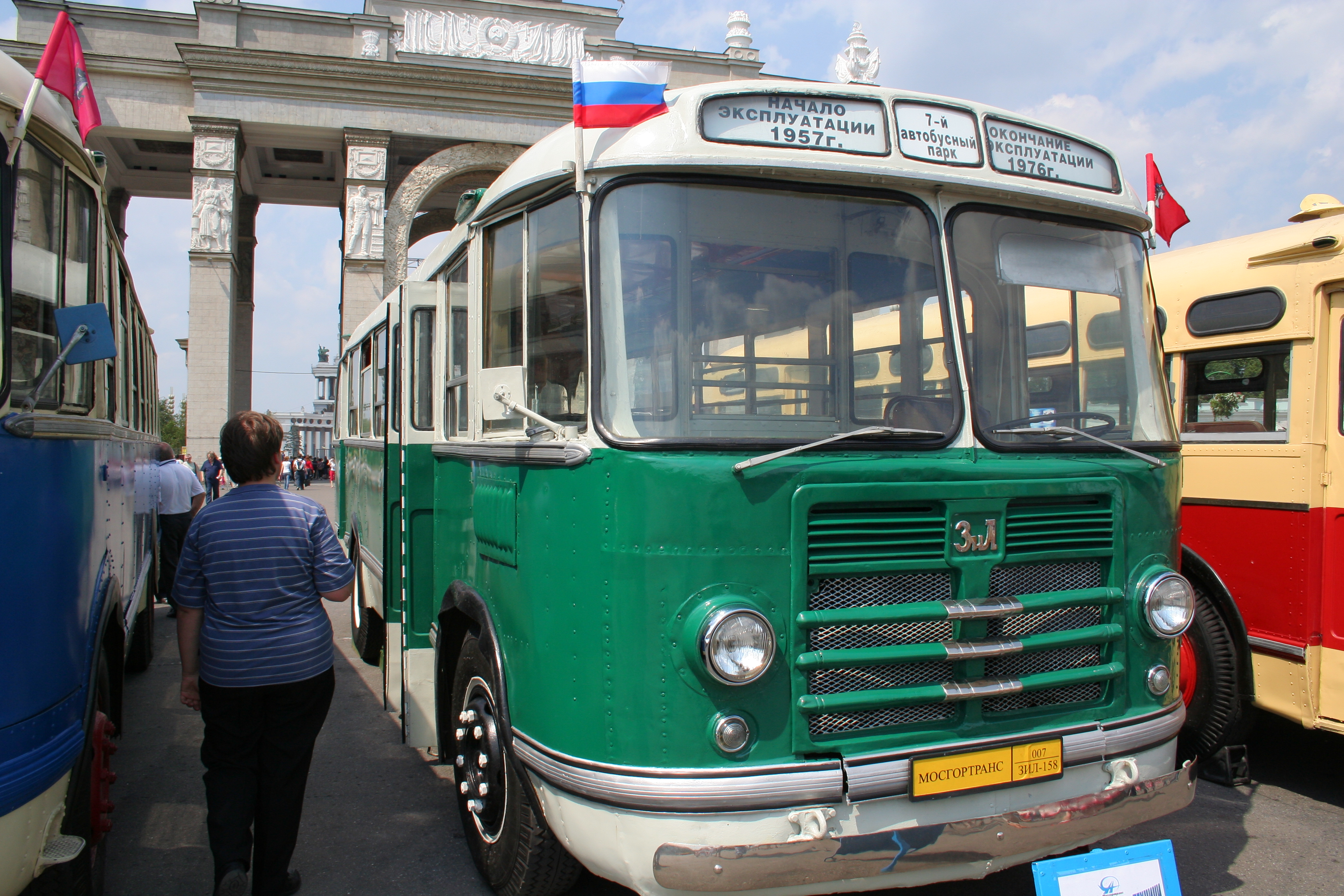
ZIL-158

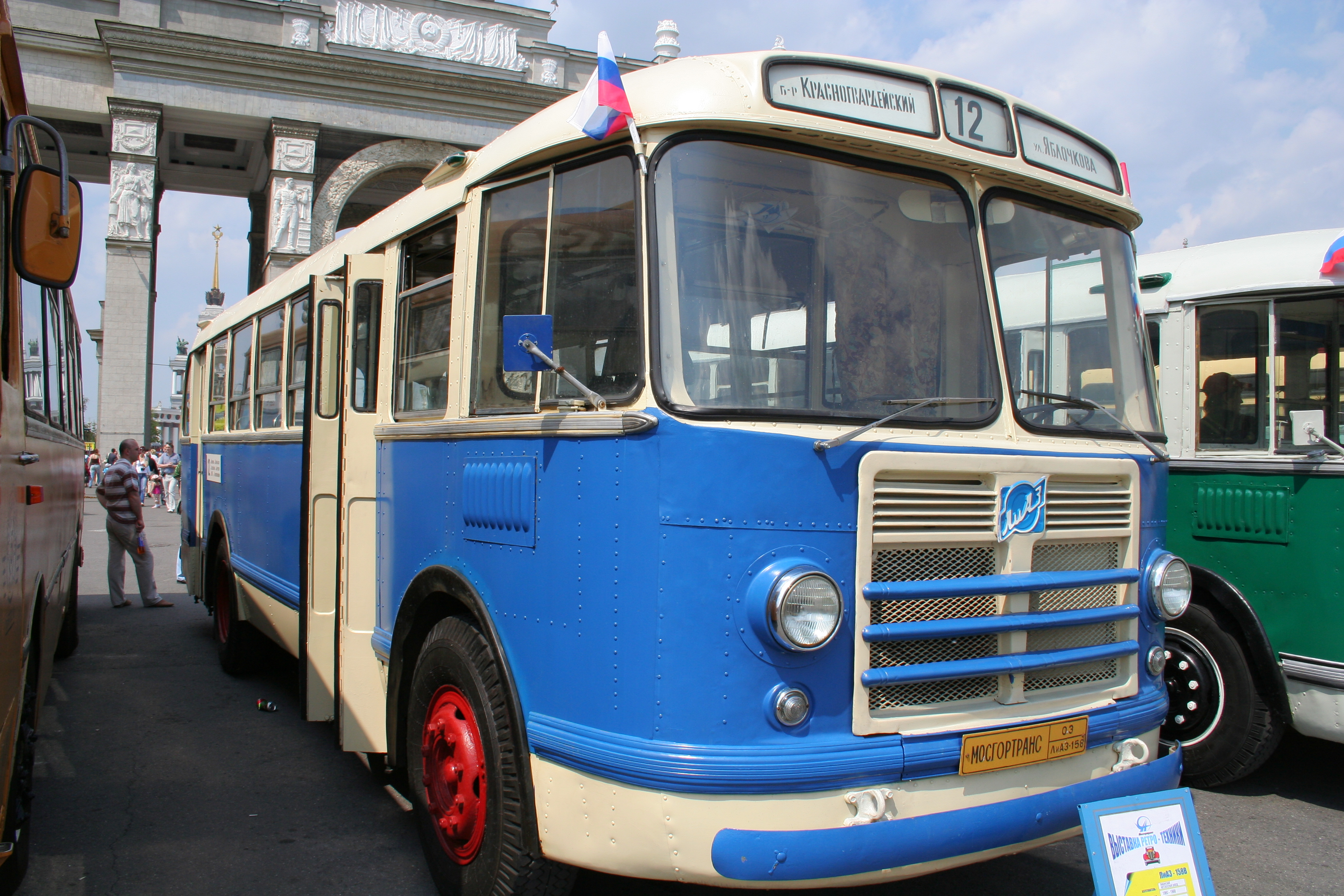
LiAZ-158 (ZIL-158V), 1965

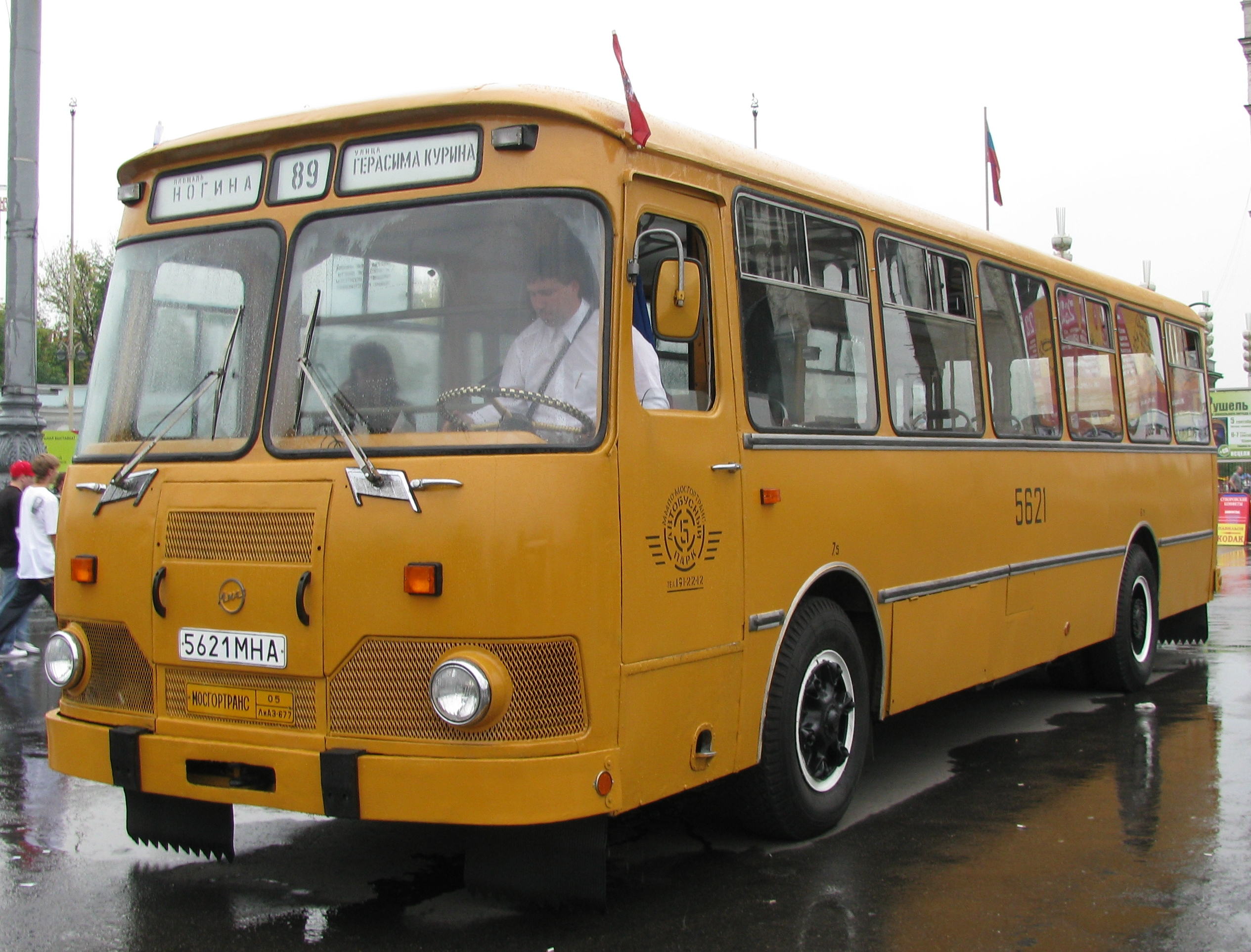
LiAZ-677M

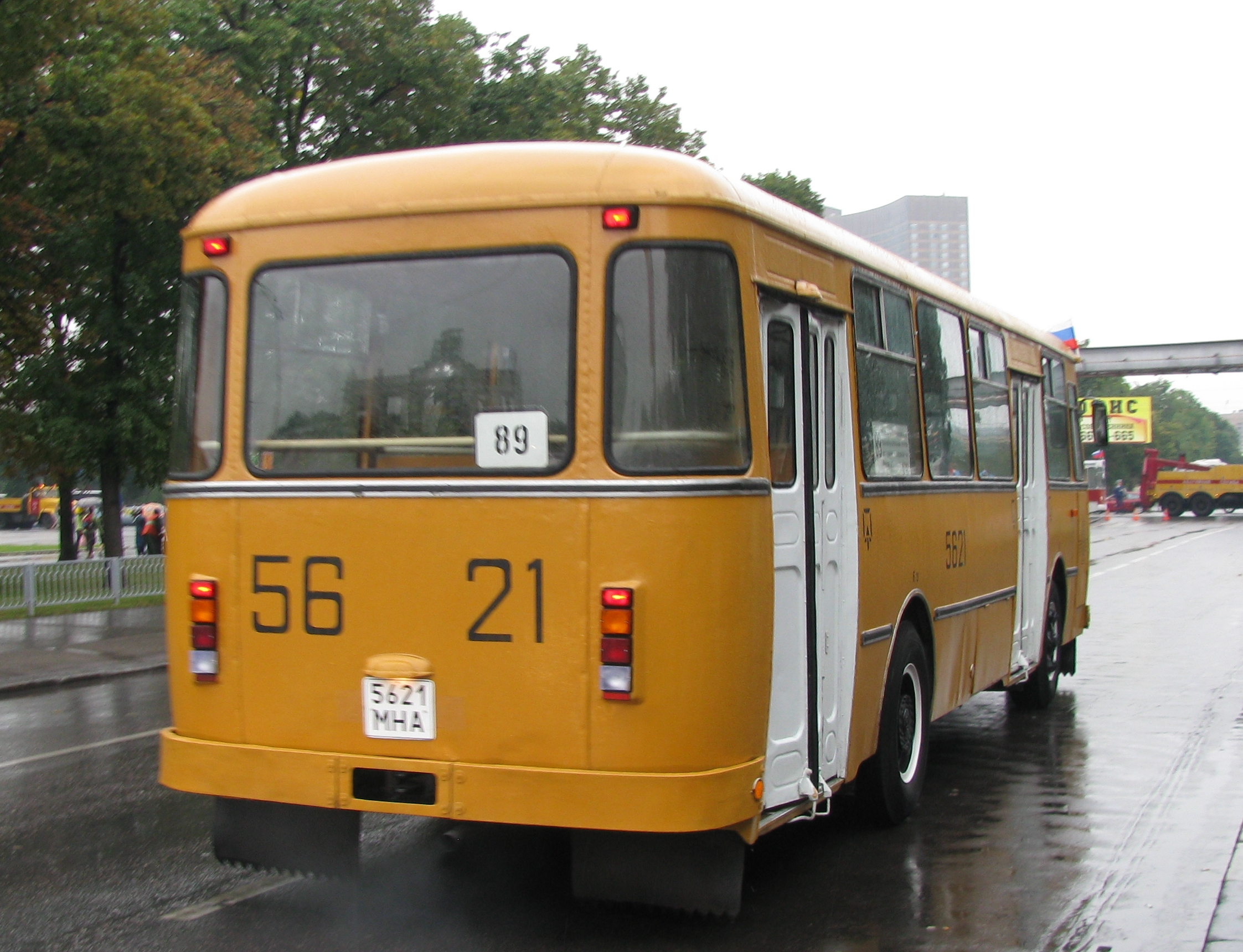
LiAZ-677M, rear view

==== Current model range ====
- LiAZ-4292 (since 2015), low-floor city bus of middle class
- LiAZ-5250 (since 2017)
- LiAZ-5251 (since 2014)
- LiAZ-5290 (since 2017)
- LiAZ-5291 (since 2014)
- LiAZ-5292 (since 2004), rear-engined low-floor bus. Buses of this model were used for the Olympic games 2014 in Sochi
- LiAZ-5293 (since 2006), rear-engined low-entry bus
- LiAZ-6213 (since 2007), low-floor articulated bus based on LiAZ-5292
- LiAZ-6228 (since 2014)
- LiAZ-6274 (since 2018), low-floor electric bus
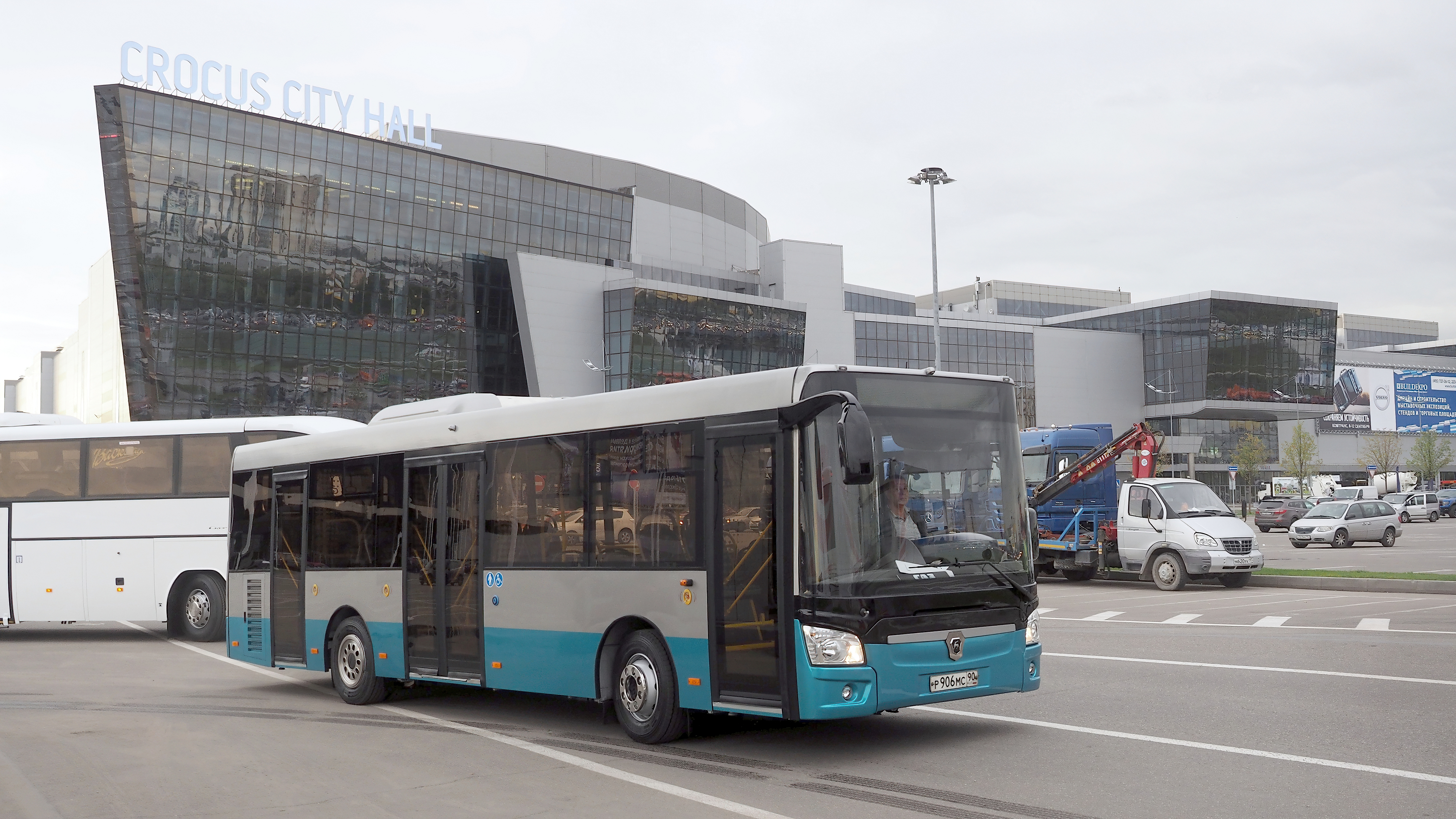
LiAZ-4292

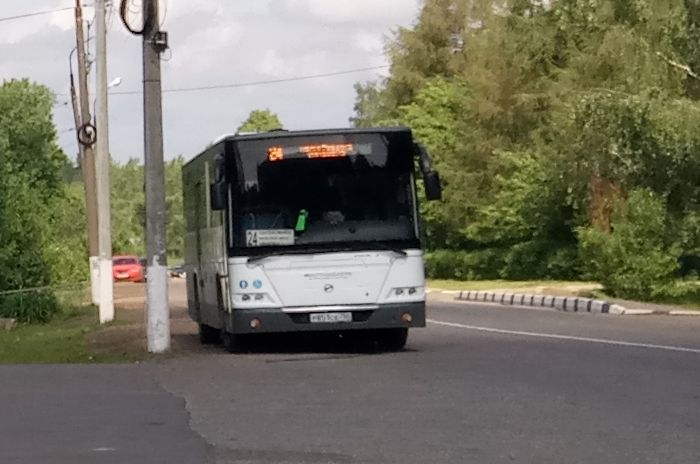
LiAZ-5250

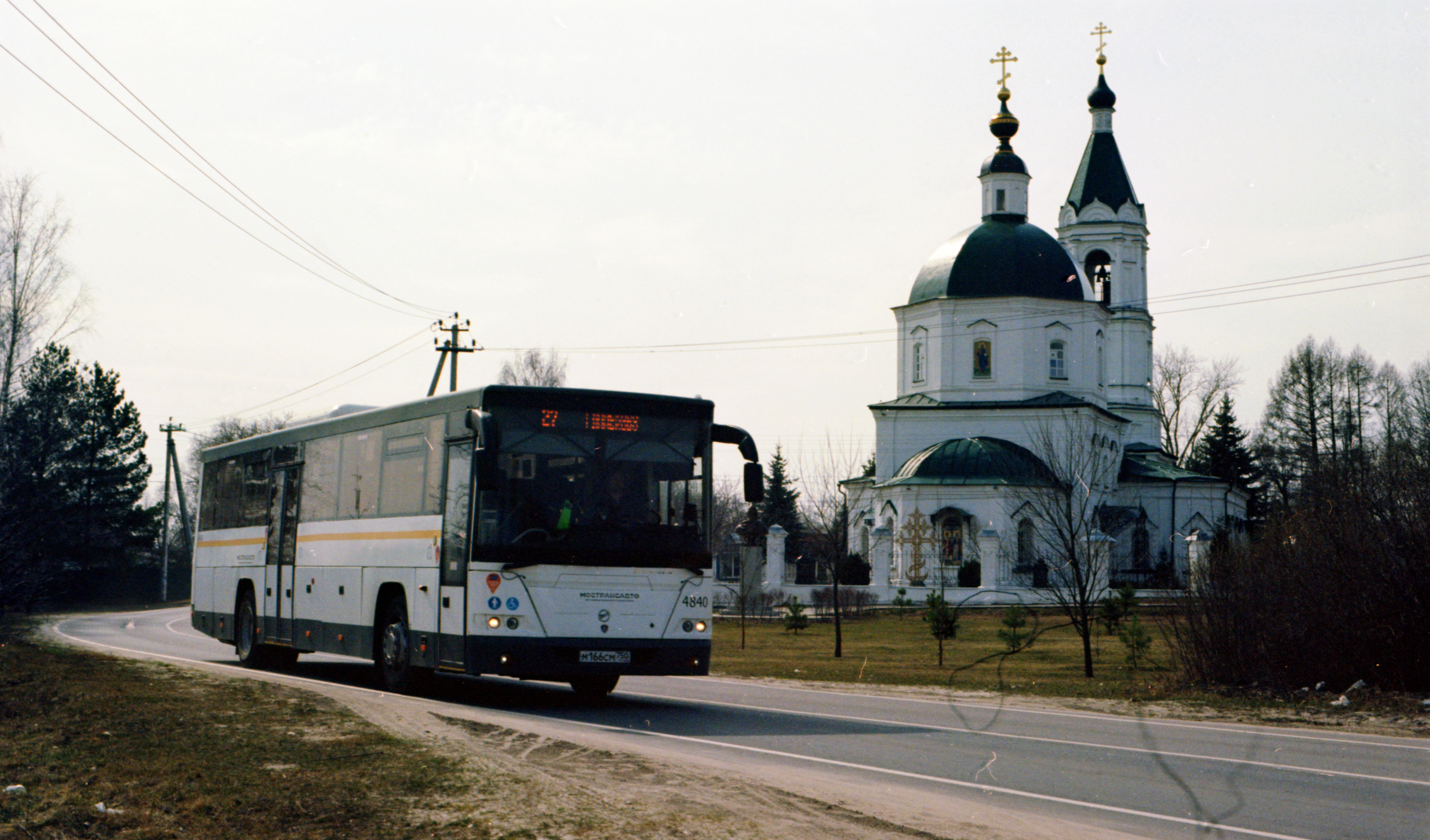
LiAZ-5251

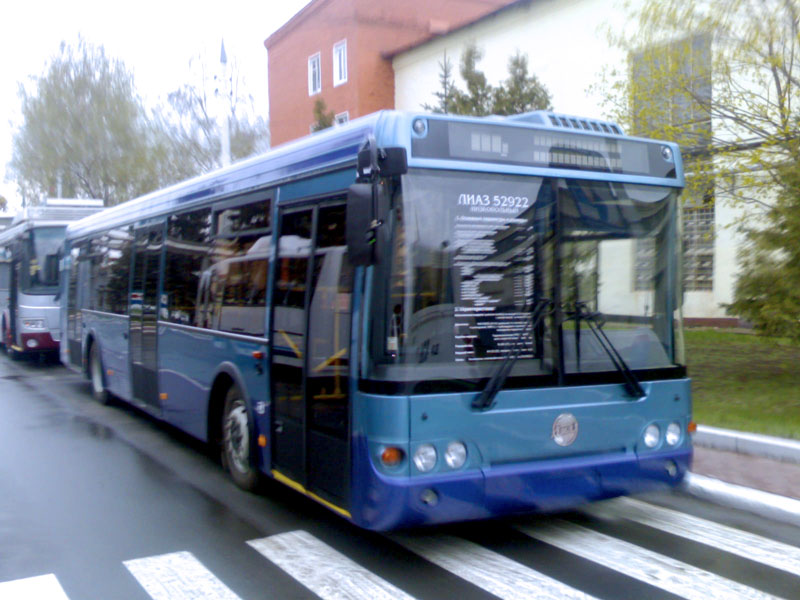
LiAZ-5292

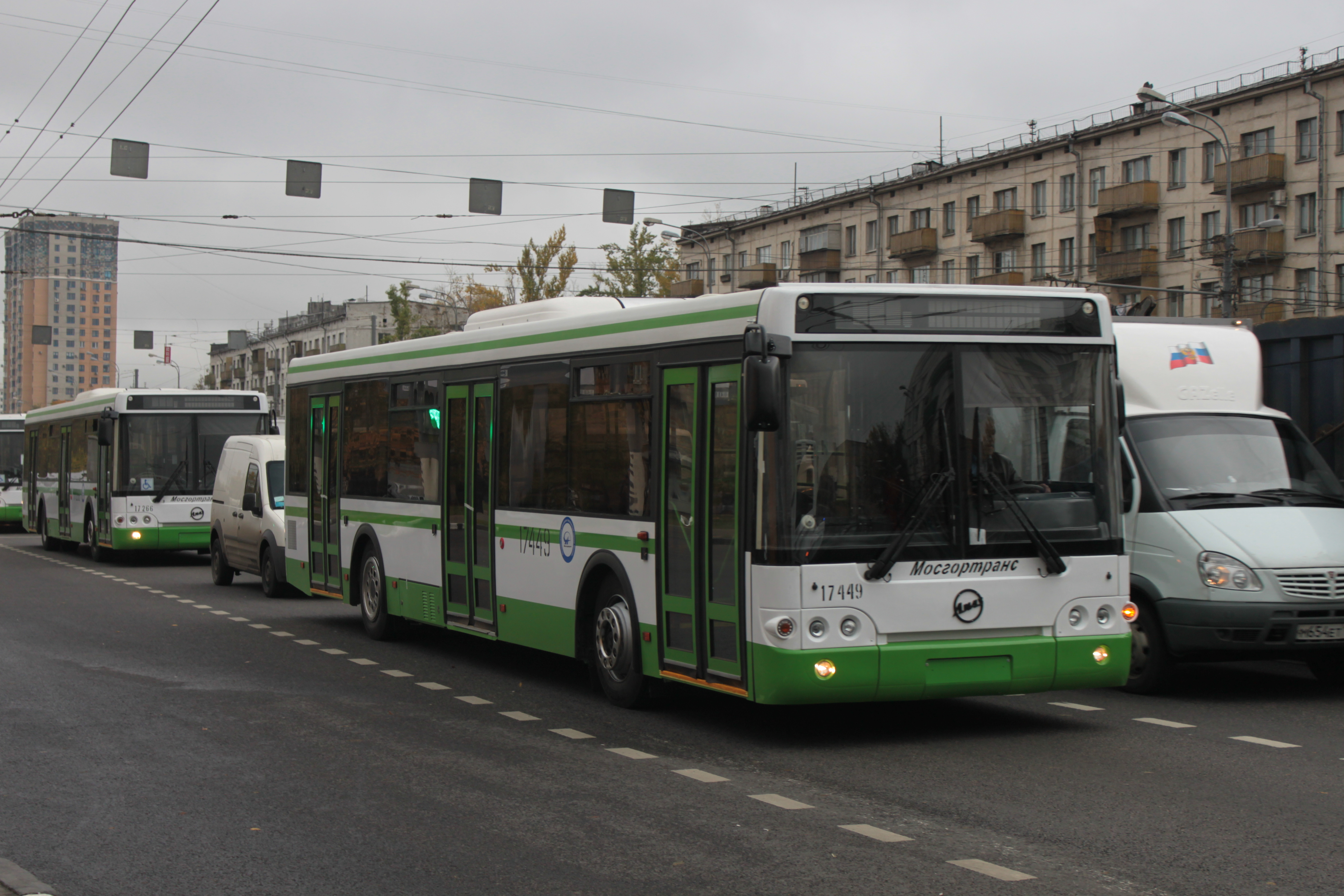
LiAZ-5292 restyling of 2011

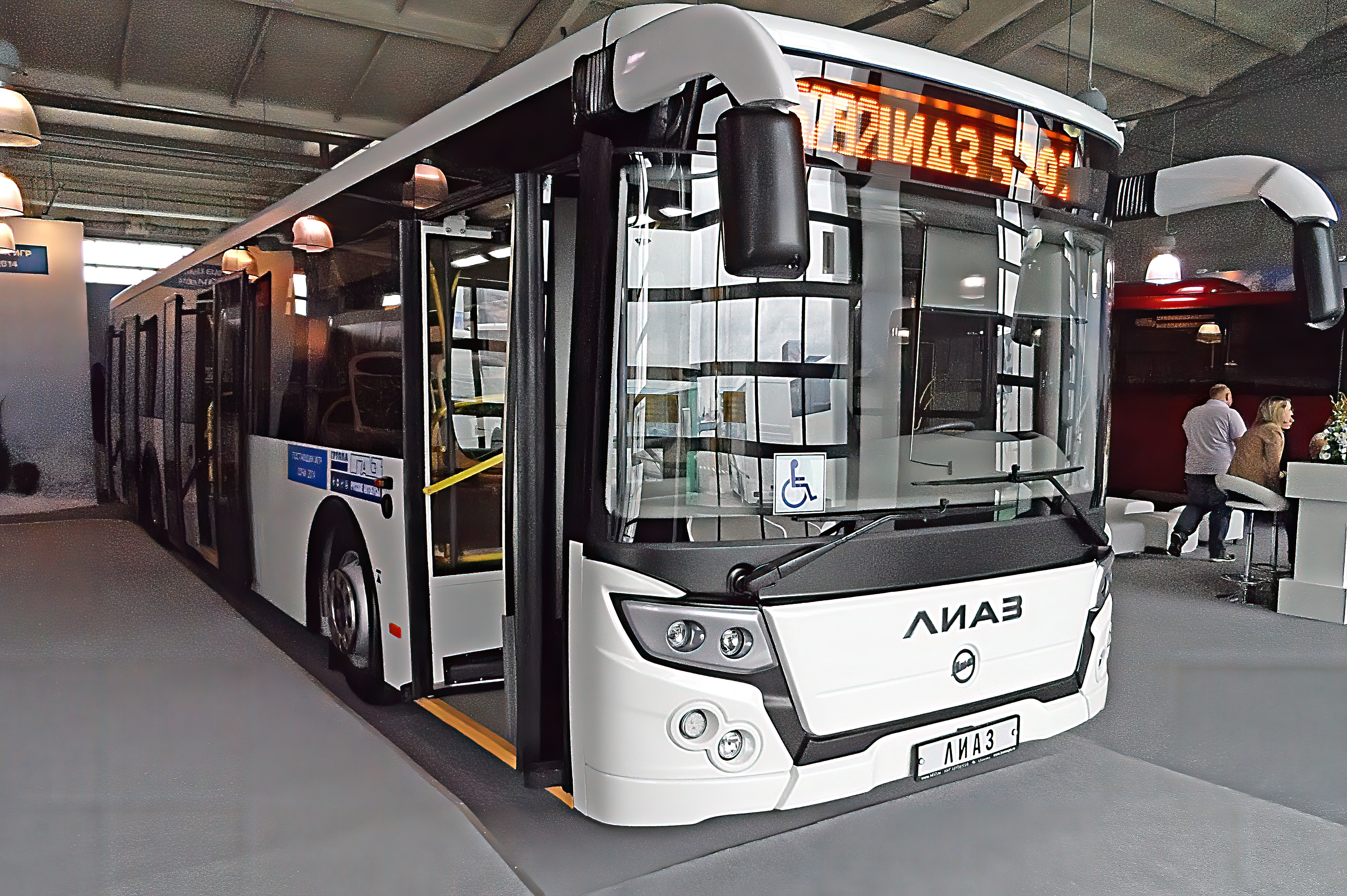
LiAZ-5292 restyling of 2013

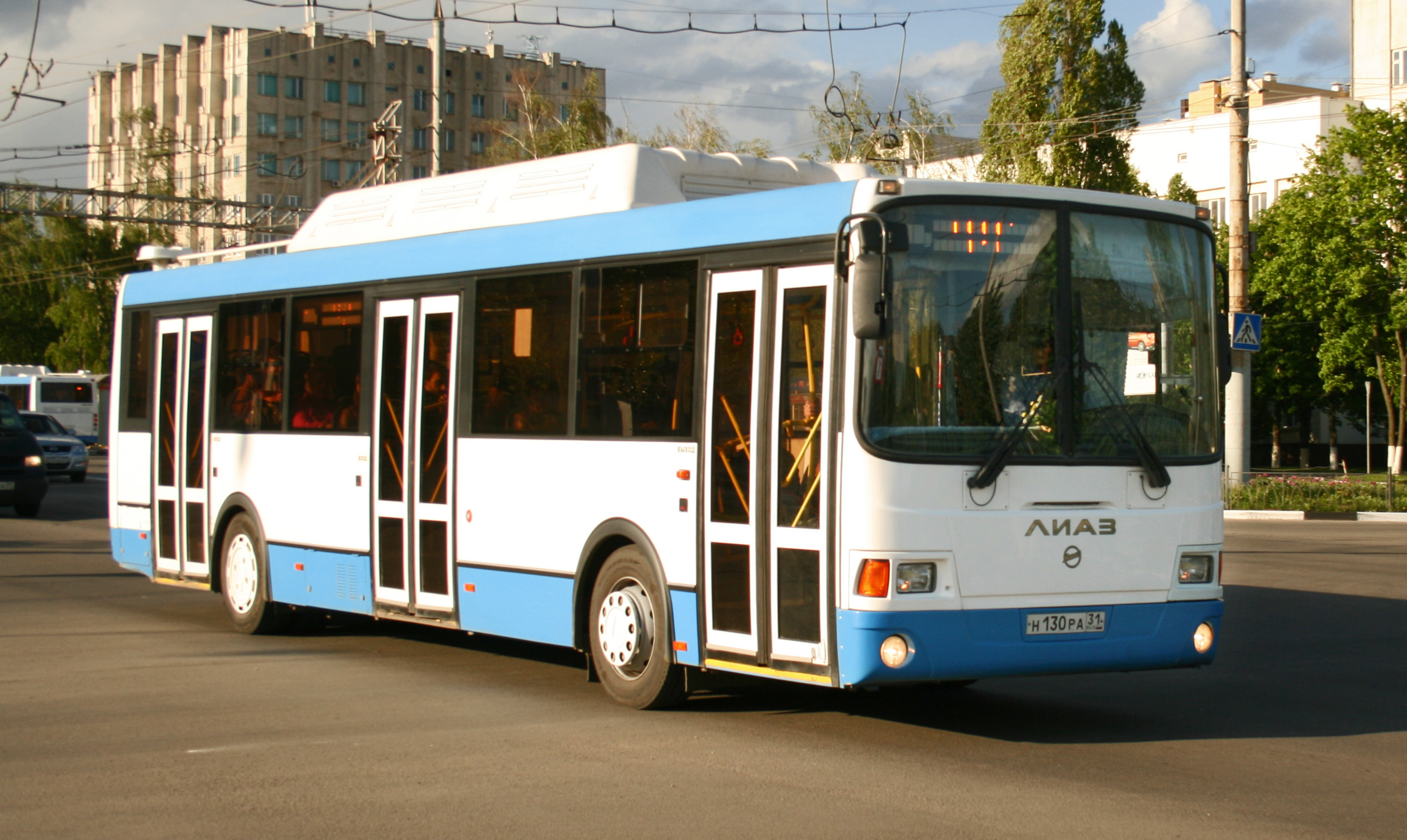
LiAZ-5293

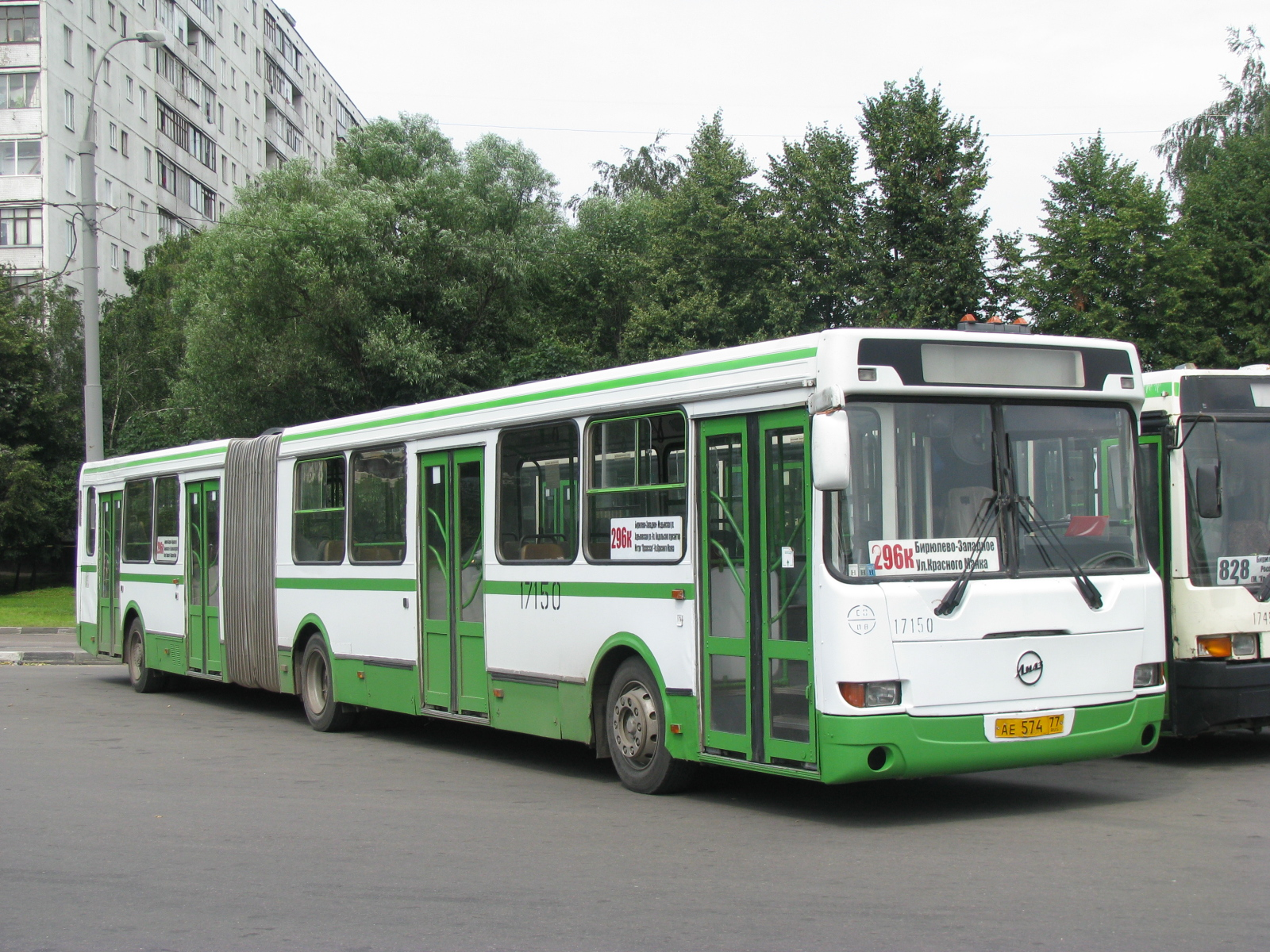
LiAZ-6212

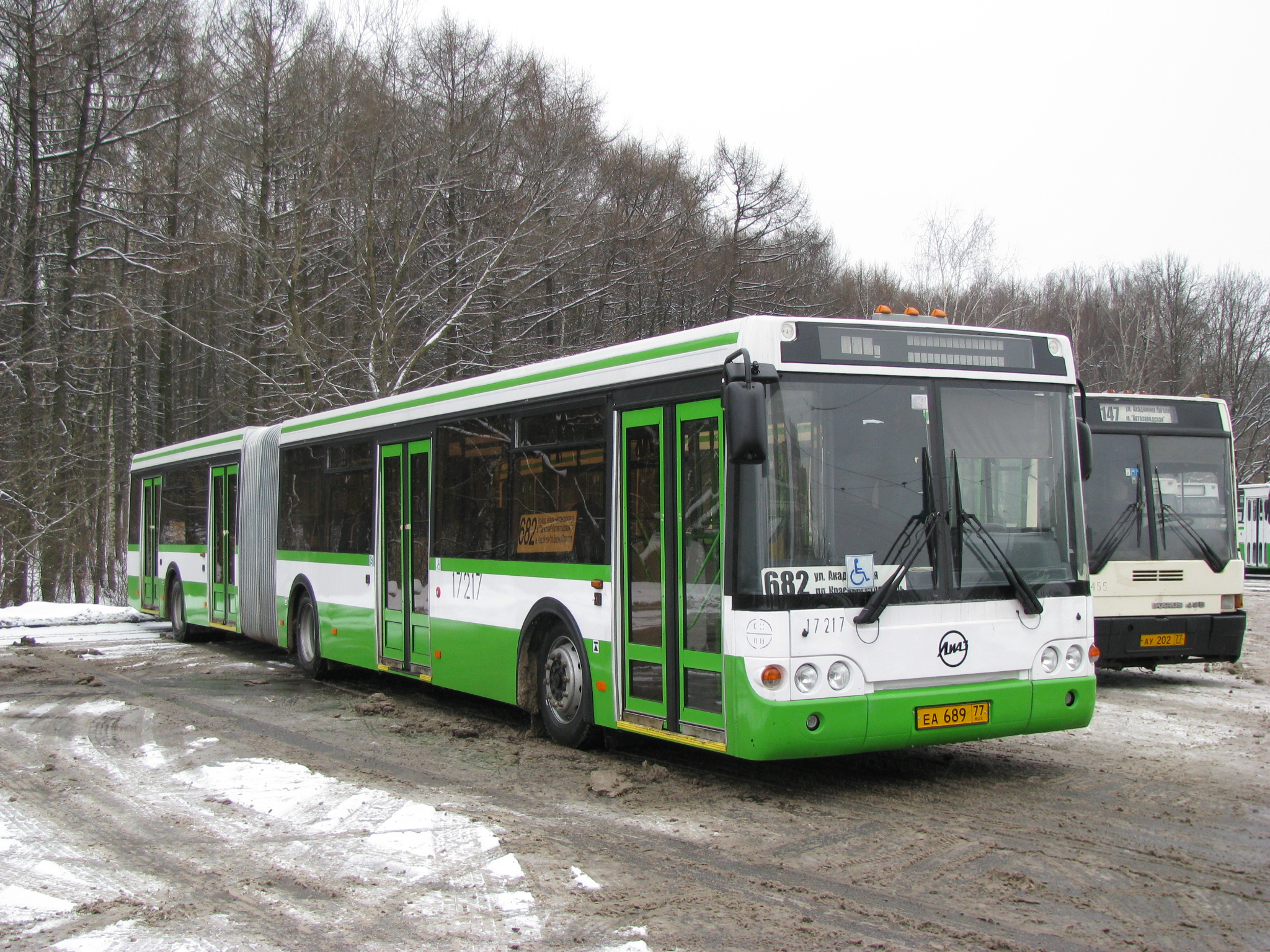
LiAZ-6213

=== Trolleybuses ===
- LiAZ-5280 (2005–2012), trolleybus based on LiAZ-5256
- LiAZ-52802, low-floor trolleybus based on LiAZ-5292
- LiAZ-52803, low-entry trolleybus based on LiAZ-5293

== See also ==
- GoLAZ
- GAZ Group
- Russkiye Avtobusy
