= Gotovye =

Gotovye Готовье
- Selo
- Location within Belgorod Oblast Location within Russia
- Coordinates: 51°10′N 37°59′E
- Country: Russia
- Region: Belgorod Oblast
- District: Starooskolsky District
- Time zone: UTC+3:00

Gotovye (Russian: Готовье) is a rural locality (a selo) in Starooskolsky District, Belgorod Oblast, Russia. The population was 52 as of 2010. There are 3 streets.

== Geography ==
Gotovye is located 24 km southeast of Stary Oskol (the district's administrative centre) by road. Babaninka is the nearest rural locality.
