= GolAZ =

Russian bus manufacturer

JSC "Golitsynsky Bus Plant" (GolAZ)
- Native name: ОАО «Голицынский автобусный завод»
- Company type: Public Company
- Industry: Engineering
- Founded: 1990
- Headquarters: Maliye Vyaziomy near Golitsyno, Moscow Region, Russia
- Products: Buses
- Parent: GAZ Group
- Website: golaz.gaz.ru

GolAZ is a former Russian bus manufacturer belonging to the GAZ Group. Its "Golitsynsky Bus Plant" is located in Moscow's Odintsovsky District. The company specializes in designing and manufacturing of intercity buses and coaches of the large and extra-large class.

Until 2013 it produced city buses; buses of this brand were booked for the Olympic games 2014 in Sochi. The brand was discontinued in 2014 shifting bus manufacturing business to LiAZ. Since then the factory produces agricultural machines.

== Reception / Awards ==
GolAZ buses received a number of rewards. GolAZ-4244 model received the title "Best Domestic Bus 2002 in Russia". In August 2003 GolAZ received a special prize for the creation of a bus named "Cruise". Its flagship model was GolAZ AKA-6226 Rossiyanin.

== Models ==
=== Current ===
- GolAZ-LiAZ-5256 (2003–) - A large class motor coach.
- GolAZ-5291 "Cruise" (2003–) - A large class tourist bus.
- GolAZ-6228 (2008– ) - Extra large class city bus polunizkopolny triaxial.
- GolAZ-6228-10 - Motor coach extra large class.
- GolAZ-5251 "Voyage" (2013–) - A large class of long-distance bus. Production began in the first half of 2011.
- GolAZ-525110 - Intercity bus class built on Scania K IB chassis. Production began in the first half of 2012.

=== Historical ===
- GolAZ AKA Vityaz /GolAZ AKA Lider (1990–1994) -licensed copy of Mercedes-Benz O303
- GolAZ-5225 Rossiyanin (1994–2000?) - licensed copy of Mercedes-Benz O405
- GolAZ AKA-6226 Rossiyanin (1994–2000?) -licensed copy of articulated bus Mercedes-Benz O405G
- GolAZ-4242 (1999–2002)

== Gallery ==
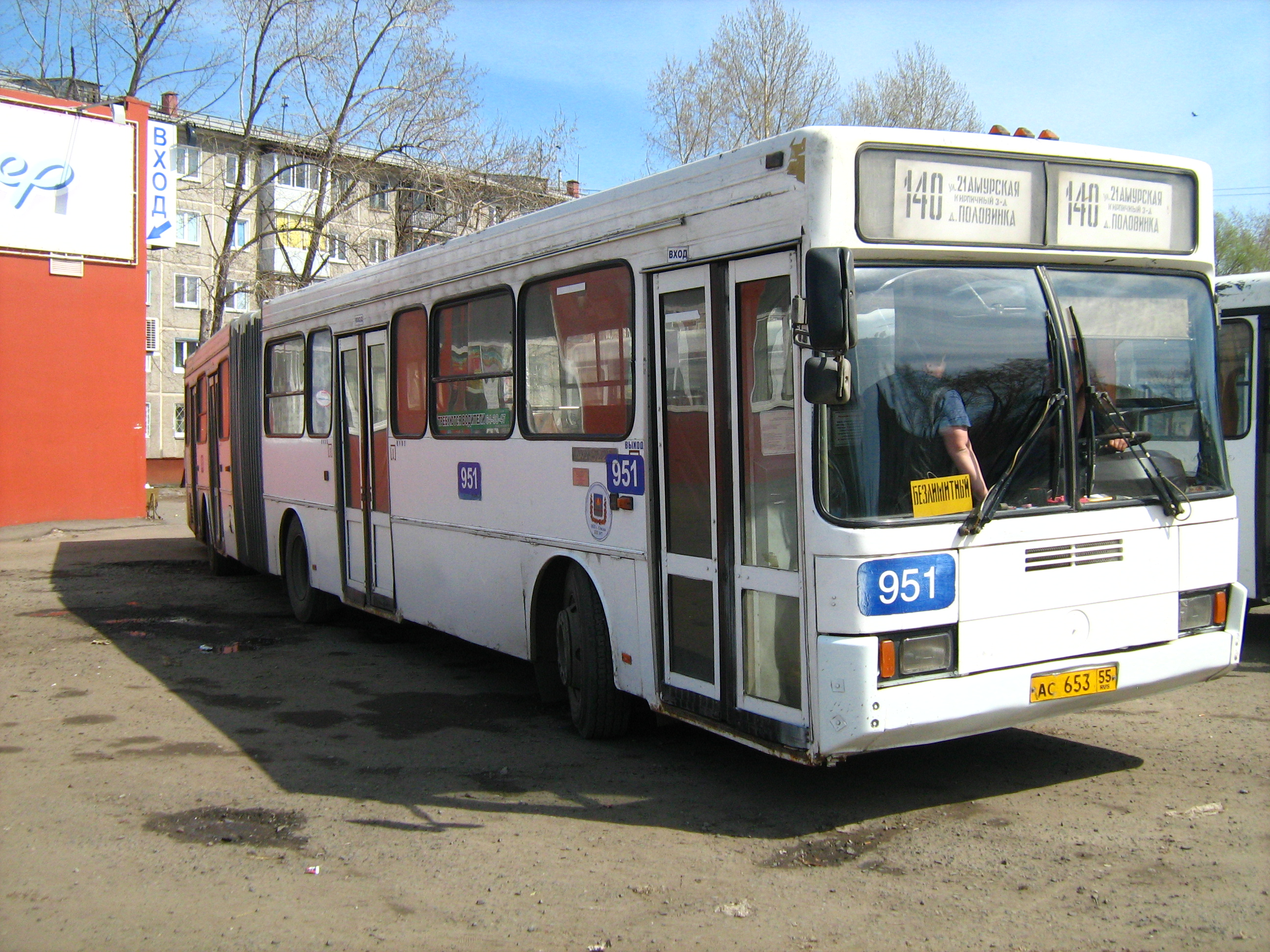
GolAZ AKA-6226 "Russian" in Omsk

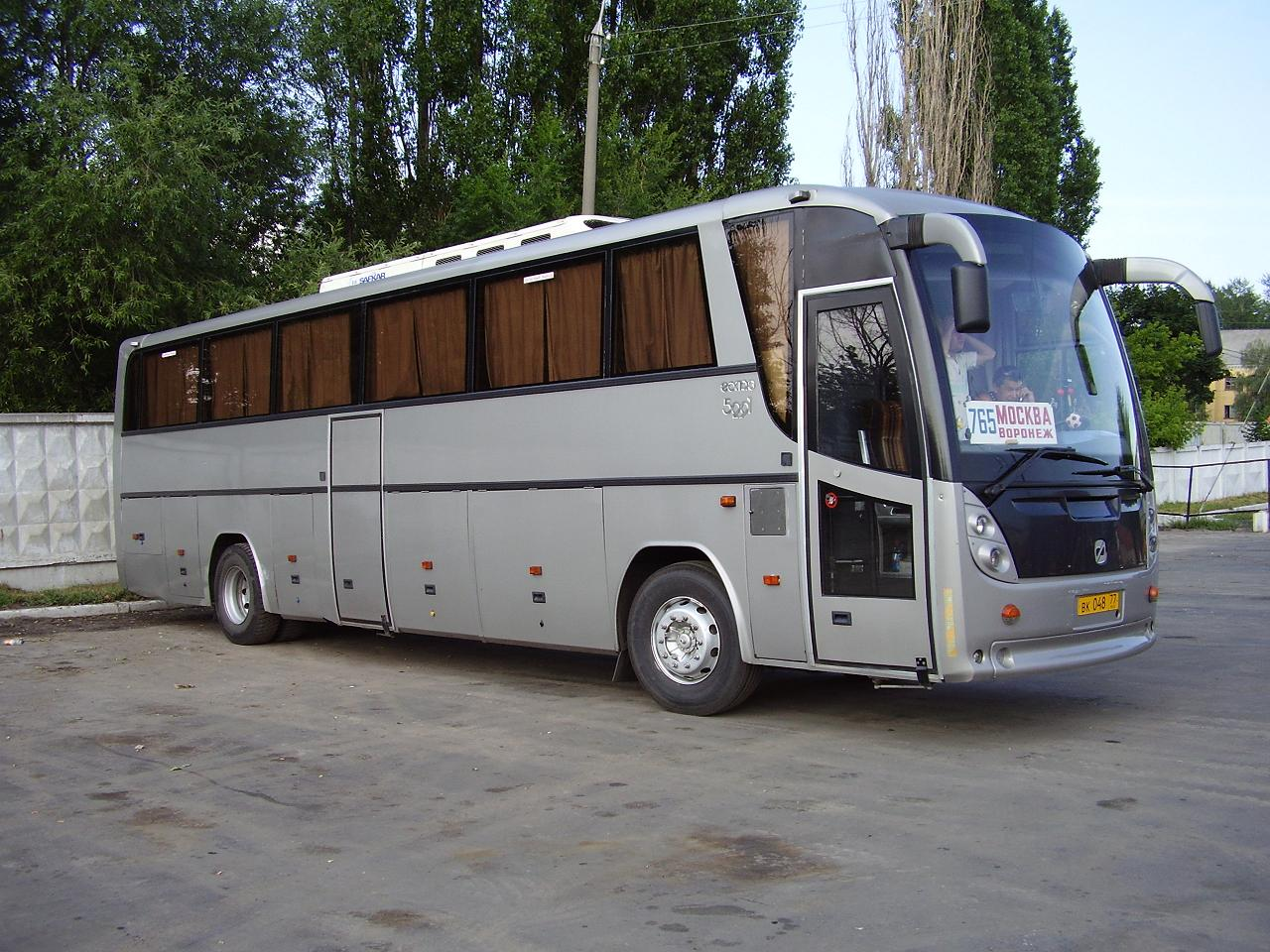
GolAZ-5291 "Cruise"

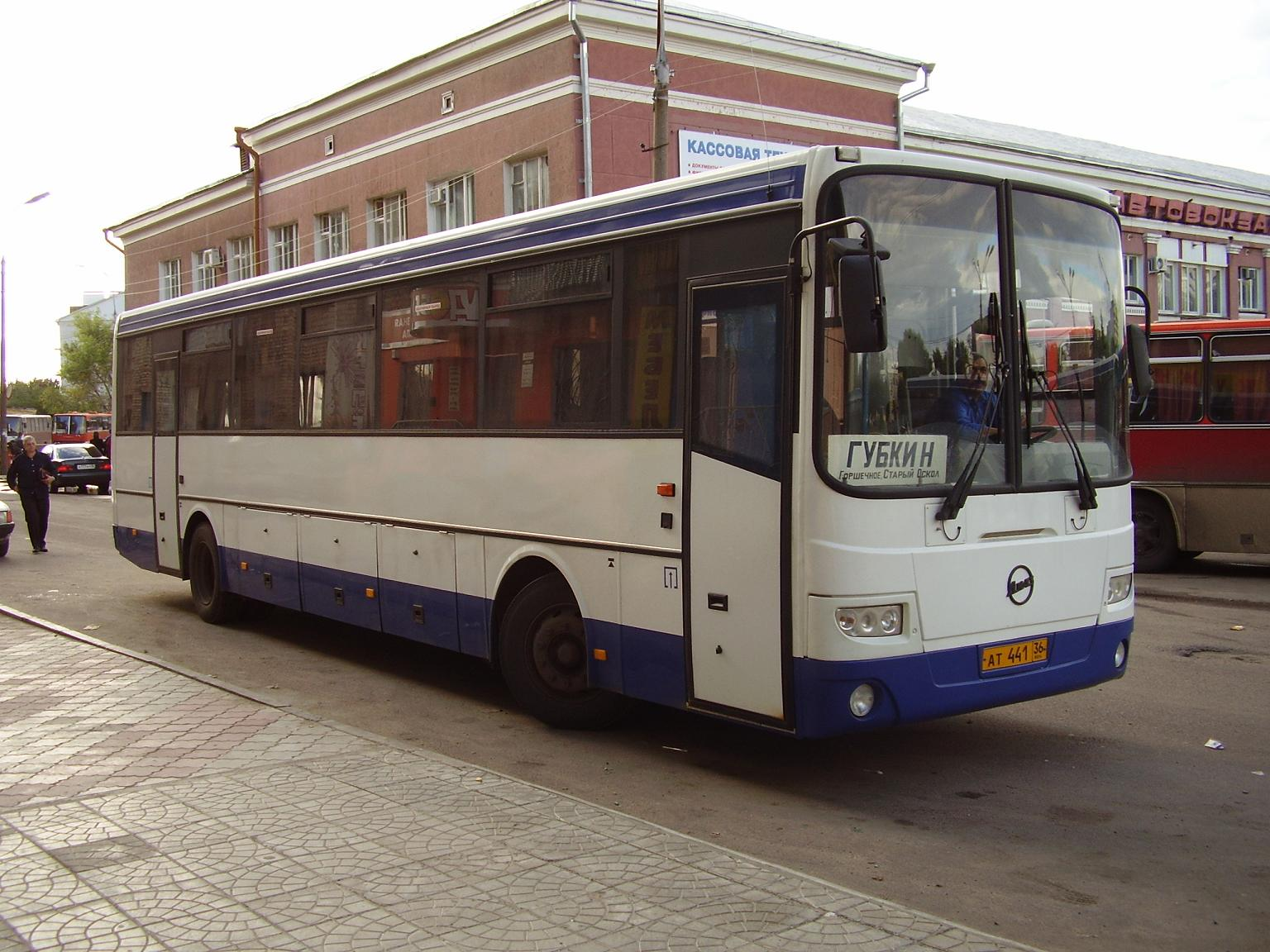
GolAZ-LiAZ-5256

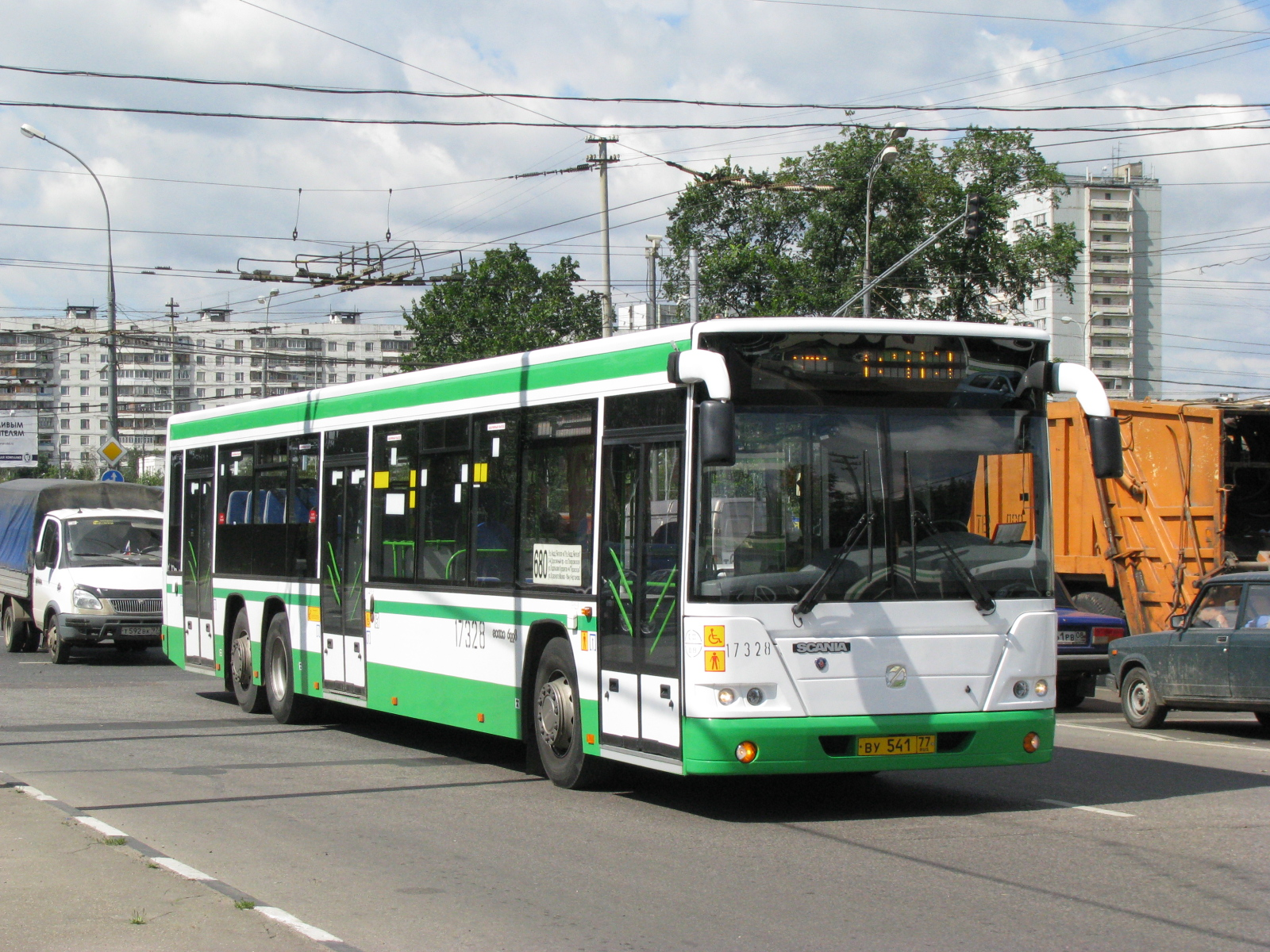
GolAZ-6228

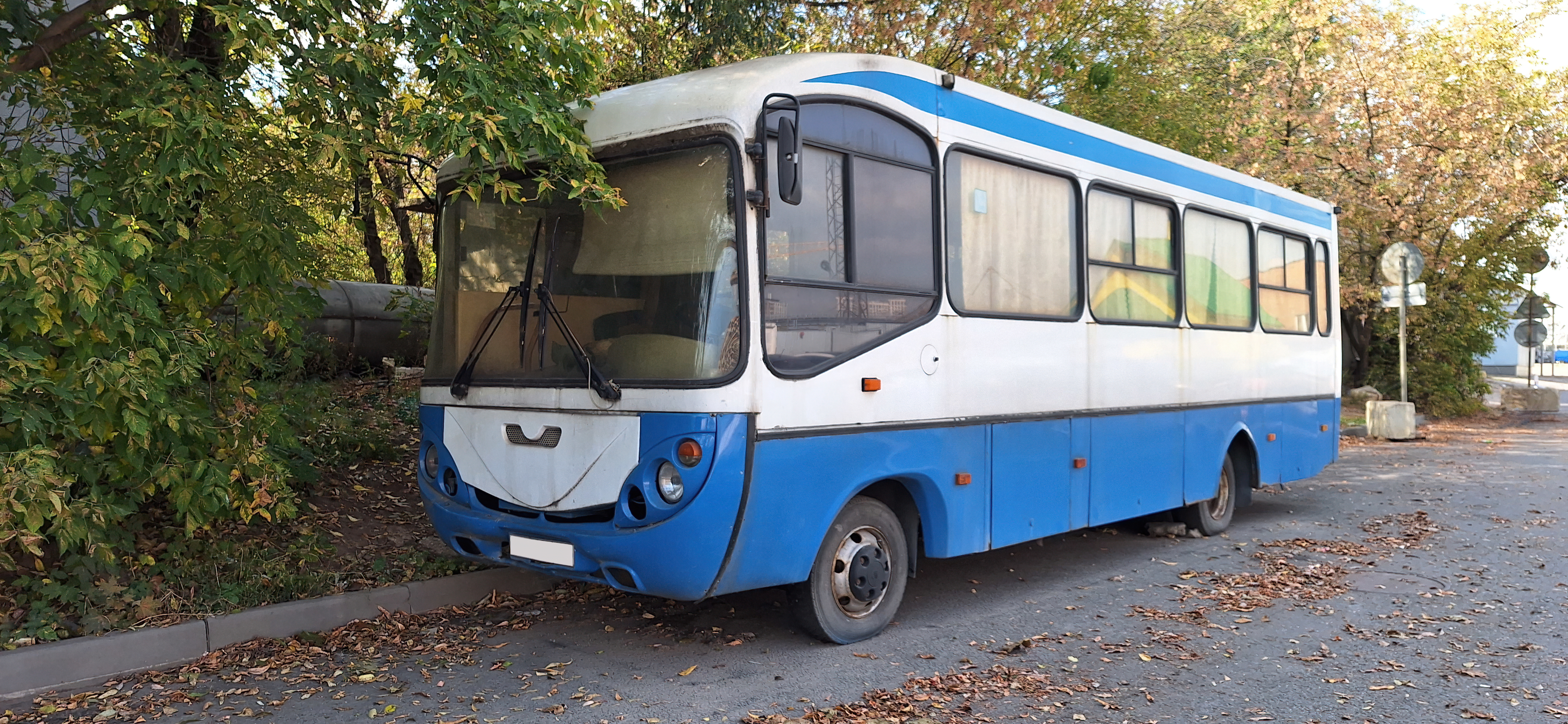
GolAZ-4244
