= ZiL-158 =

Russian bus

ZiL/LiAZ-158
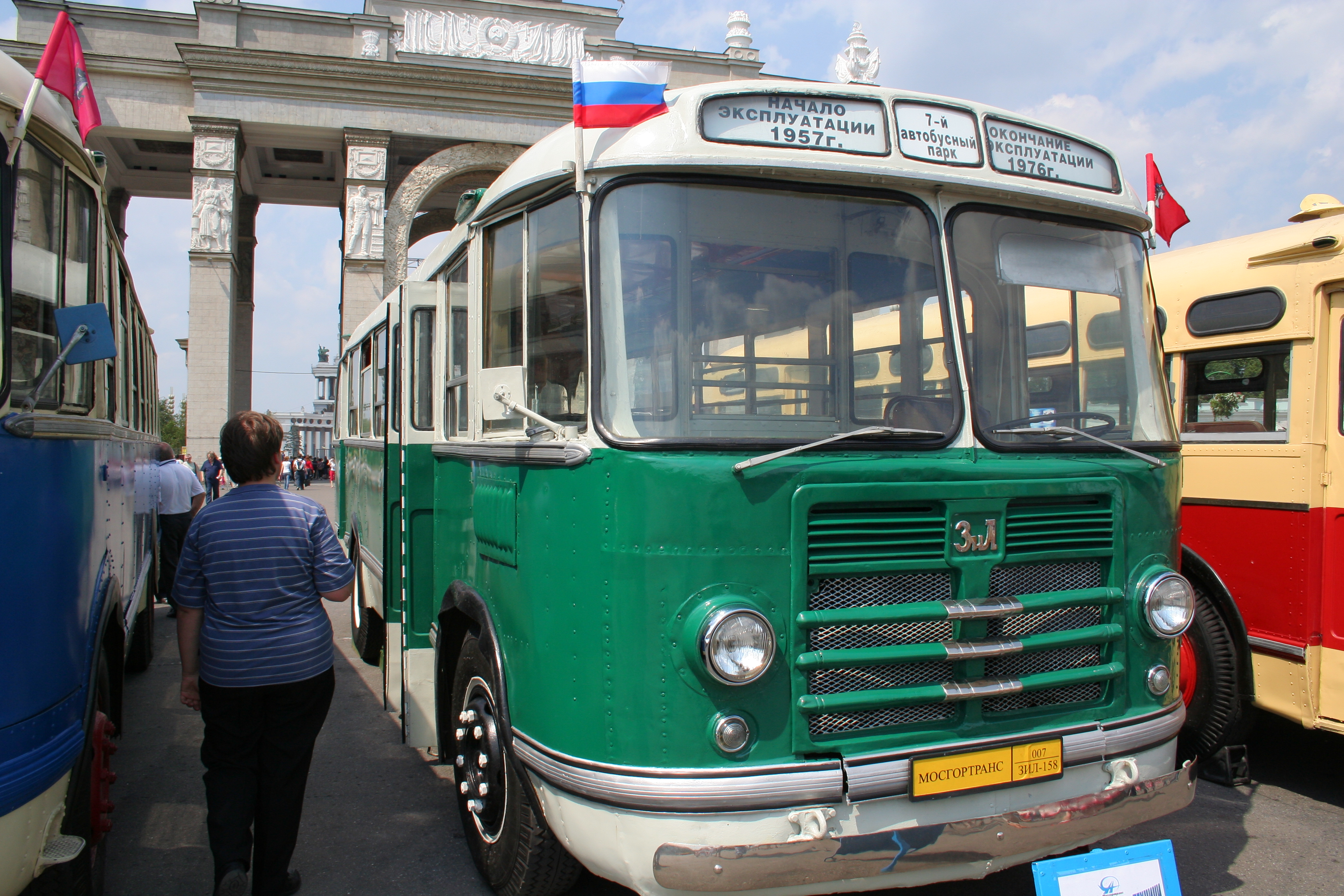
- ZiL-158 on retro exhibition in Moscow.

Overview
- Manufacturer: ZiL, LiAZ
- Production: 1957–1970
- Assembly: Moscow, Likino, RSFSR

Body and chassis
- Class: City bus
- Doors: 3
- Floor type: High entry

Powertrain
- Engine: ЗИЛ-158
- Capacity: 60 passengers

Dimensions
- Length: 9,030 mm (355.5 in)
- Width: 2,500 mm (98.4 in)
- Height: 3,000 mm (118.1 in)
- Curb weight: 6,500 kg (14,330 lb)

Chronology
- Predecessor: ZiS-155

The ZiL-158, ZiL-158V / LiAZ-158 is a city bus produced by the Likhachev Plant (1957 - 1960) and Likinsky Bus Plant (1959 - 1970).

ZIL-158 was the main bus model of city bus fleets of the Soviet Union in the 1960s and early 1970s. More than 62,350 were assembled. The assembly was carried out until the end of 1969. The most recent 158s arrived in Moscow in February 1970 to the 10-bus fleet.
