= Stary Oskol =

City in Belgorod Oblast, Russia

Stary Oskol Старый Оскол
- City
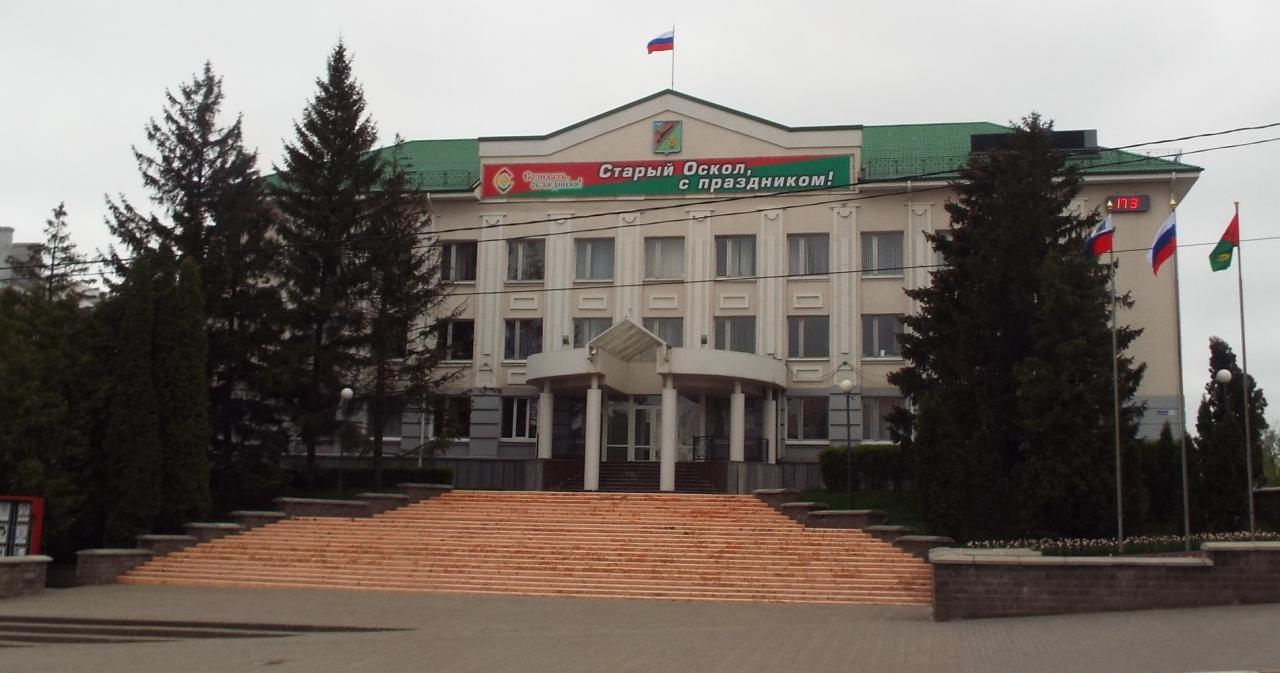
- City administration building.

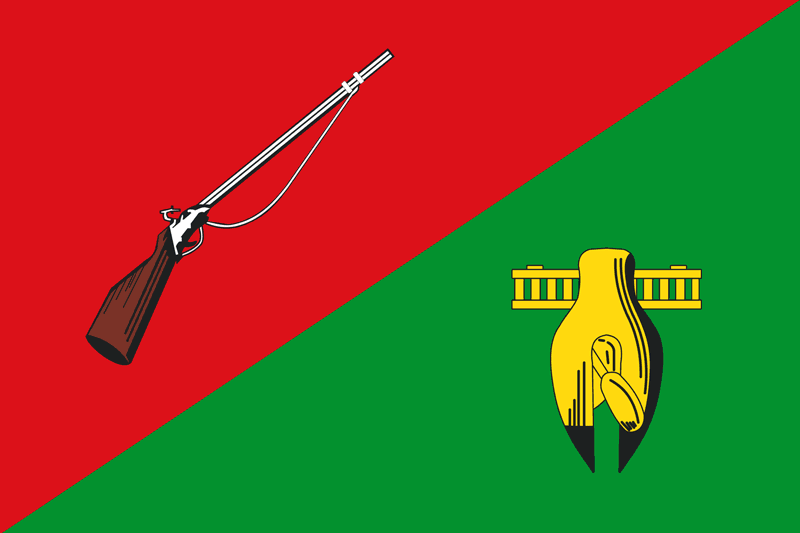
- Flag Coat of arms
- Interactive map of Stary Oskol
- Location of Stary Oskol Stary Oskol (Belgorod Oblast)
- Coordinates: 51°17′48″N 37°50′06″E
- Country: Russia
- Federal subject: Belgorod Oblast
- Founded: 1593

Government
  - Head: Vladimir Zhdanov
- Elevation: 150 m (490 ft)

Population (2010 Census)
  - Total: 221,085
  - Estimate (2025): 215,937 (−2.3%)
  - Rank: 84th in 2010

Administrative status
  - Subordinated to: city of oblast significance of Stary Oskol
  - Capital of: city of oblast significance of Stary Oskol, Starooskolsky District

Municipal status
  - Urban okrug: Starooskolsky Urban Okrug
  - Capital of: Starooskolsky Urban Okrug
- Time zone: UTC+3 (MSK)
- Postal code: 309530
- Dialing code: +7 4725
- OKTMO ID: 14740000001

Stary Oskol (Russian: Ста́рый Оско́л, IPA: [ˈstarɨj ɐˈskol]) is a city in Belgorod Oblast, Russia, located 618 kilometers (384 mi) south of Moscow. Population: 221,678 (2021 census); 221,085 (2010 census); 215,898 (2002 census); 173,917 (1989 Soviet census). It is called Stary Oskol (lit. 'Old Oskol') to distinguish it from Novy Oskol (lit. 'New Oskol') located 60 kilometres (37 mi) south. Both are on the Oskol River.

Historical population
Year	Pop.	±%
1897	16,000	—
1926	20,000	+25.0%
1939	10,946	−45.3%
1959	27,474	+151.0%
1970	51,533	+87.6%
1979	114,946	+123.1%
1989	173,917	+51.3%
2002	215,345	+23.8%
2010	221,085	+2.7%
2021	221,676	+0.3%
Source: Census data

== History ==
Oskol was first mentioned in the Ipatiev Chronicle of 1185 as a gathering point for the troops of princes Igor and Svyatoslav in their campaign against the Polovtsians. Then Oskol as a city was mentioned in the list of cities of Svidrigailo in 1432. Then there are mentions of this city in 1497, 1506. There is information that in the 1430s the city was renamed Yagoldai-sarai in honor of the Tatar murza Yagoldai. The city is the capital of the Tatar principality. At the beginning of the 16th century the city was destroyed during a raid by the Crimean Tatars and was rebuilt on the site of the destroyed Yagoldai settlement by the Russian government of Tsar Feodor Ioannovich in 1593 under the ancient name Oskol. It was near the Muravsky Trail used by Crimeans and Nogais to raid Muscovy. In 1571 a fort was built nearby. It was abandoned after 15 years, but the area was still patrolled. In 1593 Oskol was refounded as a fortress. In 1617 it was burned by the Poles. The surrounding area was frequently raided by the Tatars. In 1655 it was renamed Stary Oskol to distinguish it from the new fort at Novy Oskol. Later it was affected by the Russian Civil War in 1919, as well as by World War II, when it was captured by Hungarian troops. After World War II, industry developed in the city and its population started to grow.

== Etymology ==
The origin of the name Oskol remains unclear. According to historian Anatoly Pavlovich Nikulov, Oskol is of Turkic origin, since the lands of modern Stary Oskol in the early Middle Ages were part of the Khazar Kaganate. Another hypothesis likewise holds that Oskol is of Turkic origin and can be divided into two components: Os "Ros, Rus, Russians" and kol "pond, lake, river." In Turkic languages, the sound of "r" is replaced by a softening of the next sound, so Ros would have been pronounced as Os. Another source assumes that oskol is of Slavic origin and means "splitting, crushing," a reference to the grinding of iron ore prior to smelting. The ancient city of Oskol was located in close proximity to a large iron deposit.

== Administrative and municipal status ==
Within the framework of administrative divisions, Stary Oskol serves as the administrative center of Starooskolsky District, even though it is not a part of it. As an administrative division, it is incorporated separately as the town of oblast significance of Stary Oskol—an administrative unit with a status equal to that of the districts. As a municipal division, the territories of the city of oblast significance of Stary Oskol and of Starooskolsky District are incorporated as Starooskolsky Urban Okrug.

== Politics ==
On 17 March 1996, elections of deputies of the territorial Council of the city of Stary Oskol and Stary Oskol district took place, as a result of which 21 deputies were elected.

On 20 March 1996, the results of the elections for the head of local government were officially announced:

- Ivan Gusarov - 35%
- I. N. Zhikharev - 22.8%
- Nikolai Shevchenko - 39.4%

The number of votes cast against all candidates was 2.8%. Thus, Nikolai Shevchenko became the head of local government of the city. On 22 March 1996, the first operational meeting took place with the participation of the elected mayor of Stary Oskol.

On 3 April 1996, the opening of the first session of the territorial Council of Deputies of the city of Stary Oskol and Stary Oskol district took place in a solemn atmosphere.

On 4 December 2011, elections to the 6th State Duma were held in the city, in which United Russia won with a result of 35.4%.

== Economy ==
Stary Oskol is an important center of iron ore mining, situated at the border of the Kursk Magnetic Anomaly, one of the largest deposits of iron ore worldwide. Over eight million tons of iron ore are mined here per year. For this reason there is also a branch of the Moscow Institute of Steel and Alloys in the city.

== Education ==
One of the oldest kids music schools in the city is located in the city center, on Lenina Street.

== Notable people ==
- Vasili Eroshenko, writer, translator, esperantist, linguist, poet and teacher.
- Alexander Emelianenko, mixed martial artist
- Fedor Emelianenko, mixed martial artist
- Denis Lebedev, boxer
- Daniyel Agbalyan, Russian-Armenian footballer

== Twin towns – sister cities ==
Stary Oskol is twinned with:

- Salzgitter, Germany (1987)
- Asenovgrad, Bulgaria (1989)
- Mänttä-Vilppula, Finland (1989)
