= Starooskolsky District =

Starooskolsky District Старооскольский район (Russian)
- District
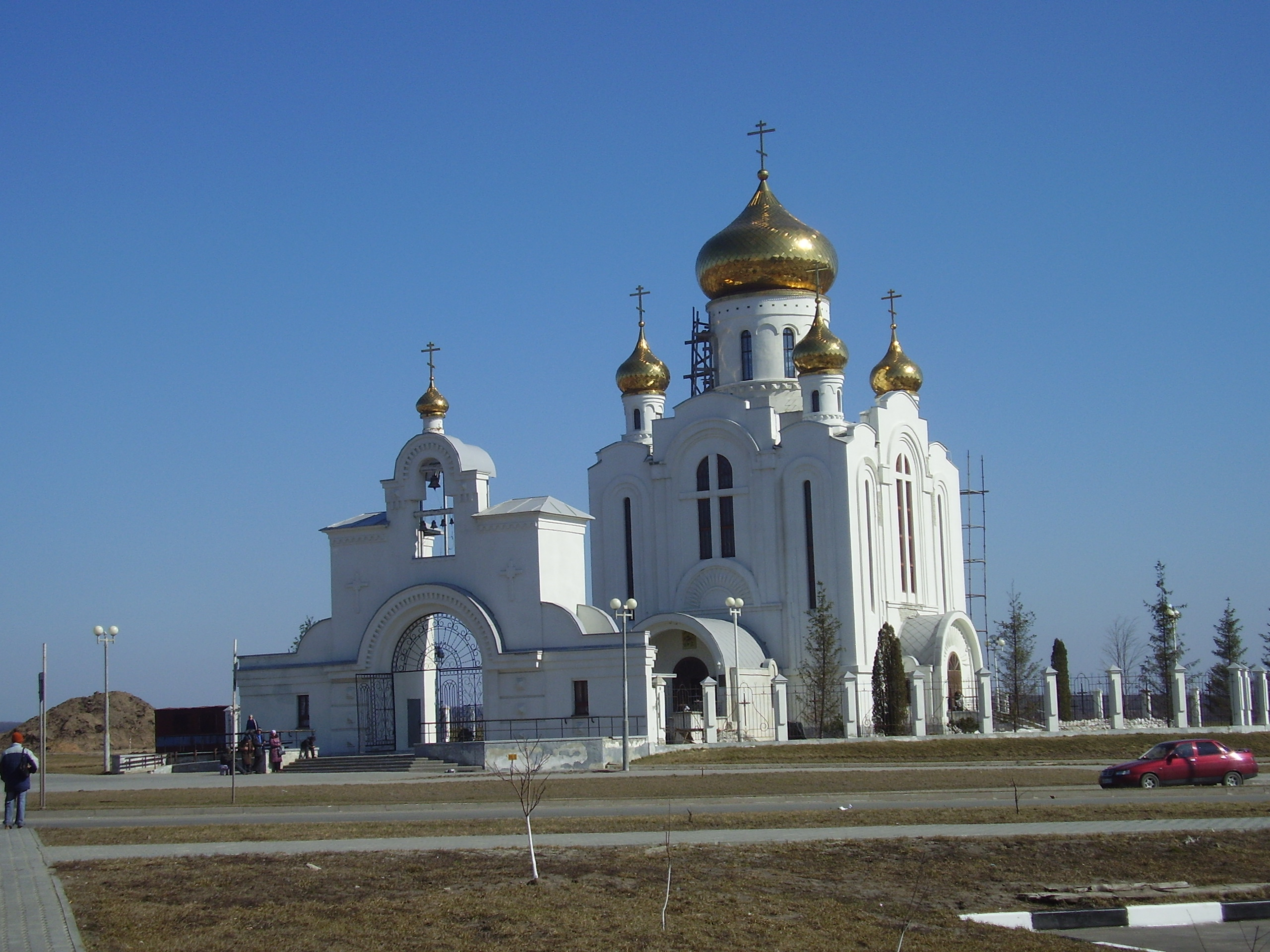
- Church of the Nativity

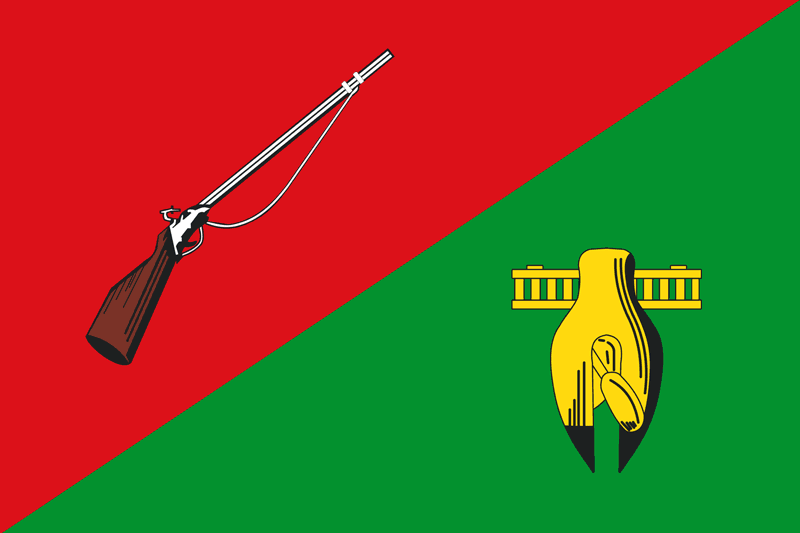
- Flag Coat of arms
- Location of Starooskolsky District in Belgorod Oblast
- Coordinates: 51.307°N 37.838°E
- Country: Russia
- Federal subject: Belgorod Oblast
- Established: 30 July 1928
- Administrative center: Stary Oskol

Area
  - Total: 1,694 km^{2} (654 sq mi)

Population (2010 Census)
  - Total: 35,457
  - Density: 20.93/km^{2} (54.21/sq mi)
  - Urban: 0%
  - Rural: 100%

Administrative structure
  - Inhabited localities: 78 rural localities

Municipal structure
  - Municipally incorporated as: Starooskolsky Urban Okrug
- Time zone: UTC+3 (MSK)
- OKTMO ID: 14740000
- Website: https://belregion.ru/region/?ELEMENT_ID=266

Starooskolsky District (Russian: Старооско́льский райо́н) is an administrative district (raion), one of the twenty-one in Belgorod Oblast, Russia. It is located in the north of the oblast. The area of the district is 1,694 square kilometers (654 sq mi). Its administrative center is the city of Stary Oskol (which is not administratively a part of the district). Population: 35,457 (2010 census); 35,063 (2002 Census); 35,266 (1989 Soviet census).

== Administrative and municipal status ==
Within the framework of administrative divisions, Starooskolsky District is one of the twenty-one in the oblast. The city of Stary Oskol serves as its administrative center, despite being incorporated separately as a town of oblast significance—an administrative unit with the status equal to that of the districts.

As a municipal division, the territory of the district and the territory of the city of oblast significance of Stary Oskol are incorporated together as Starooskolsky Urban Okrug.
