= Novosibirsk =

City and administrative centre of Novosibirsk Oblast, Russia

Novosibirsk Новосибирск
- City
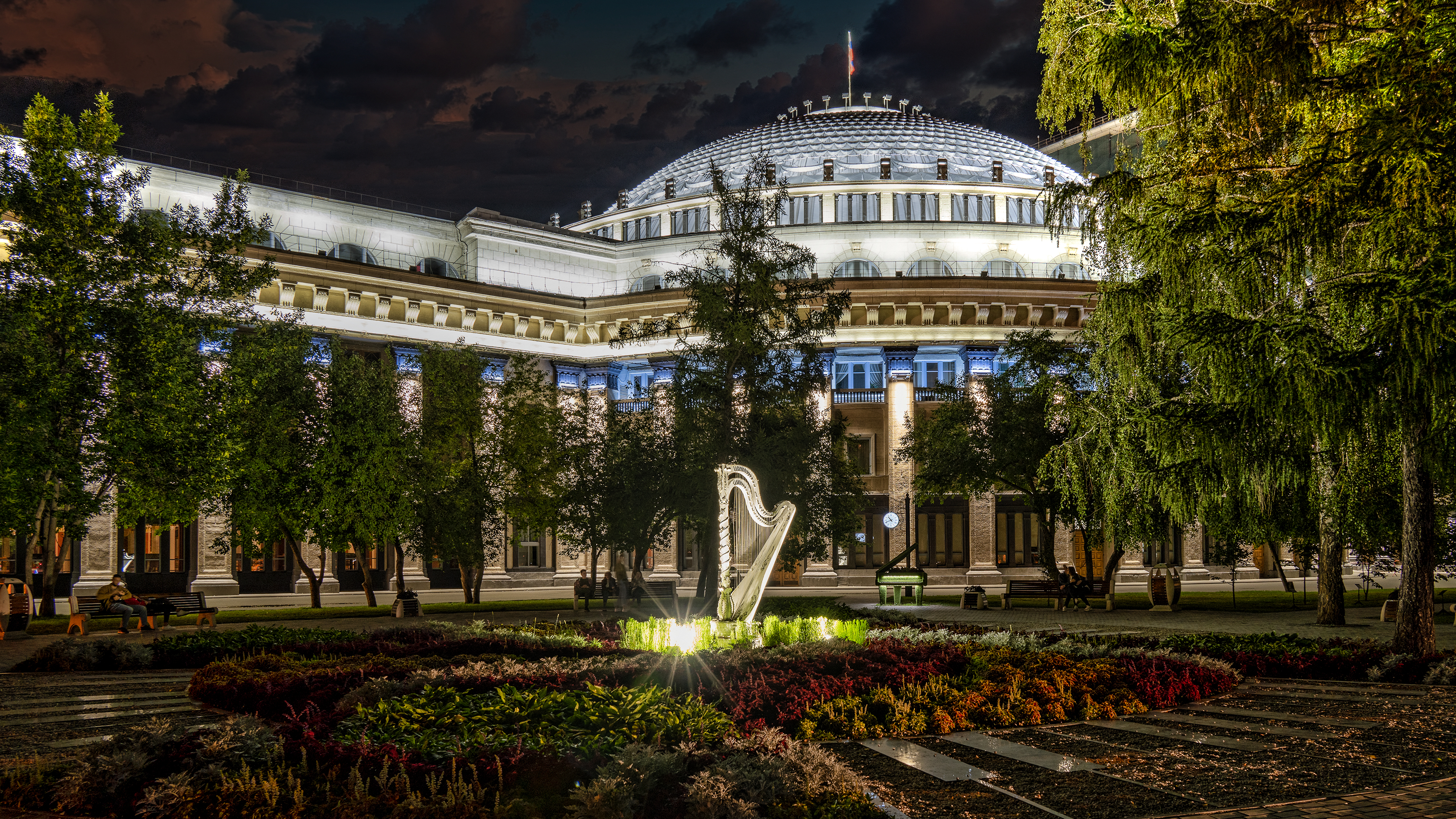
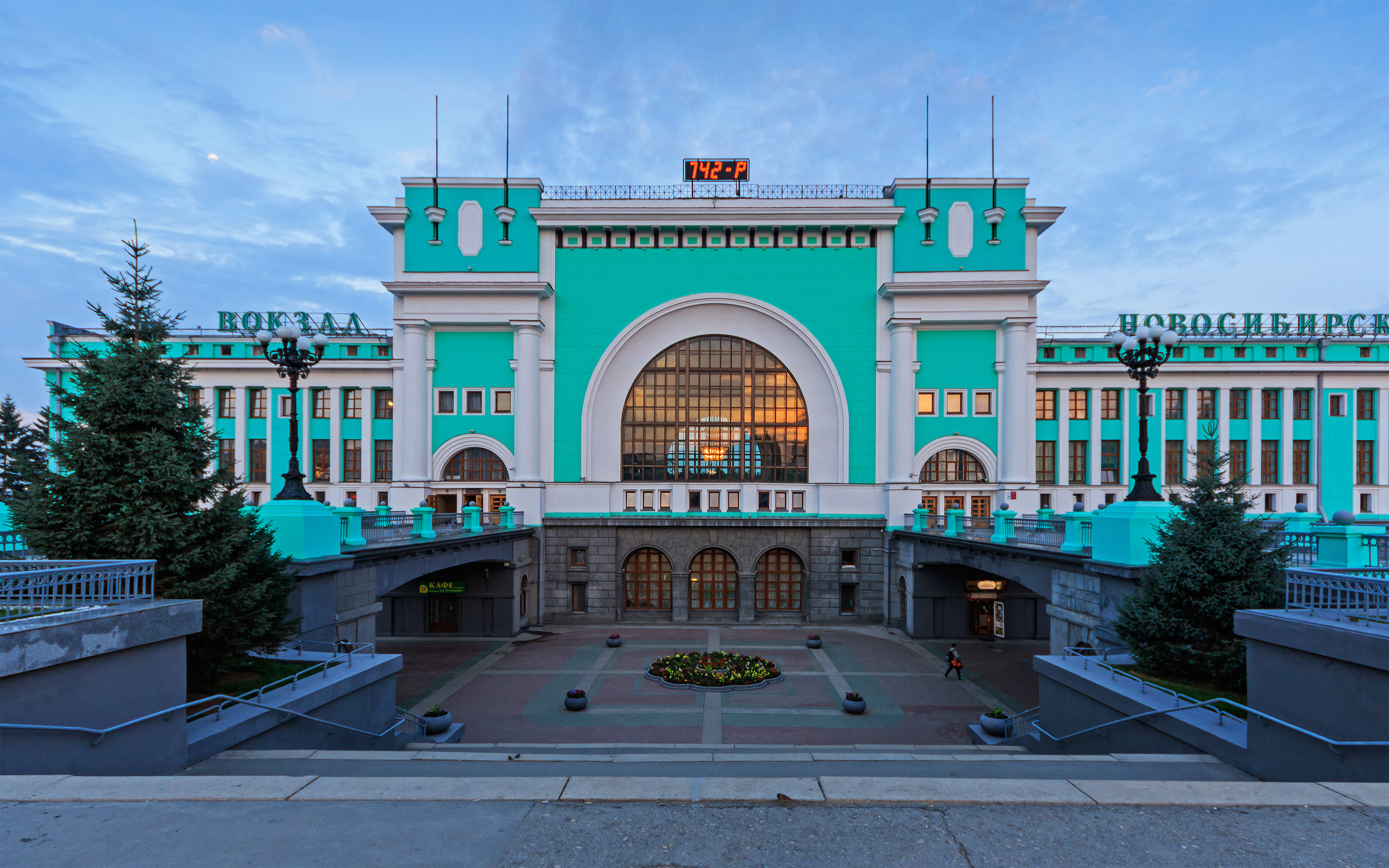
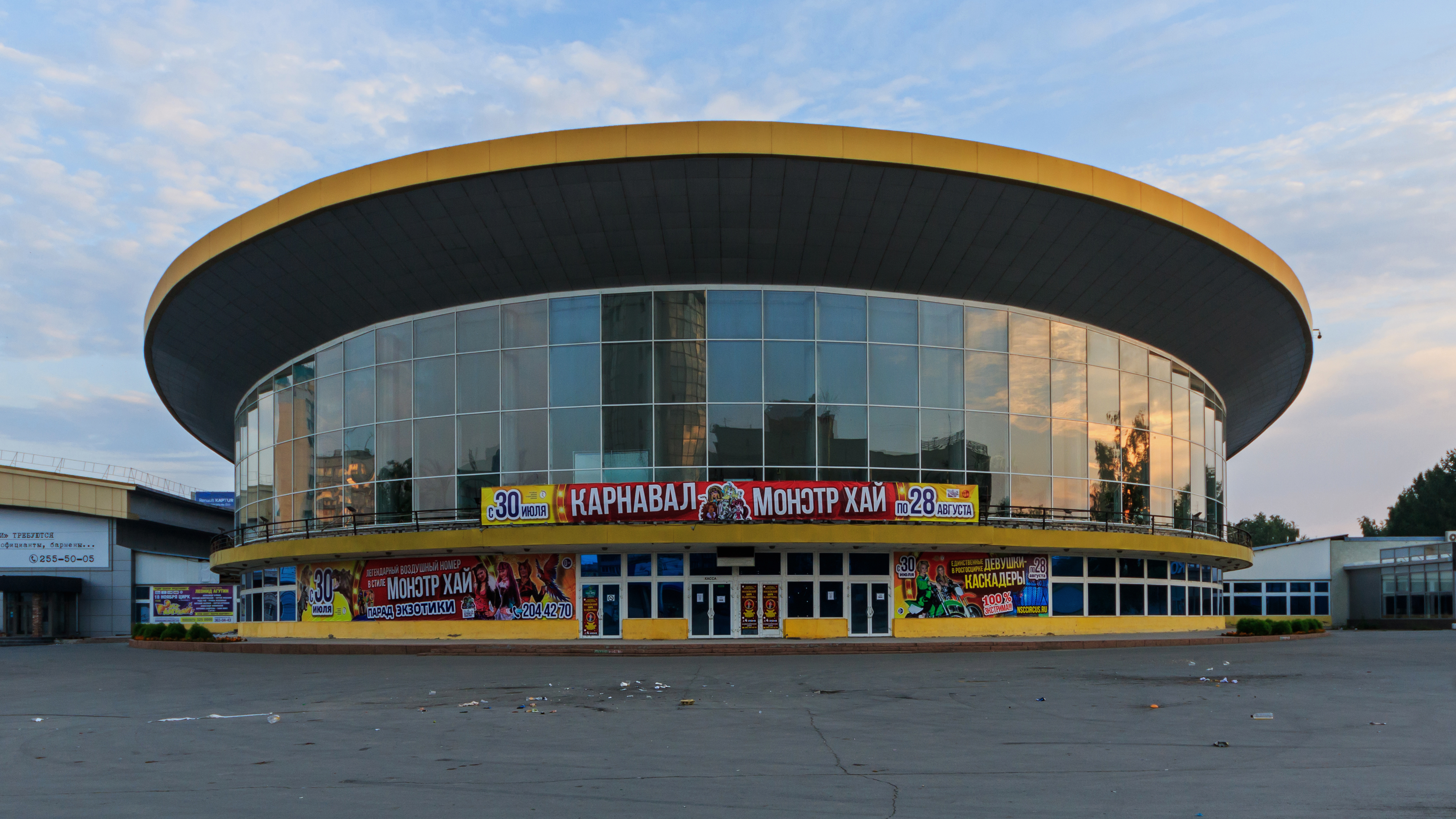
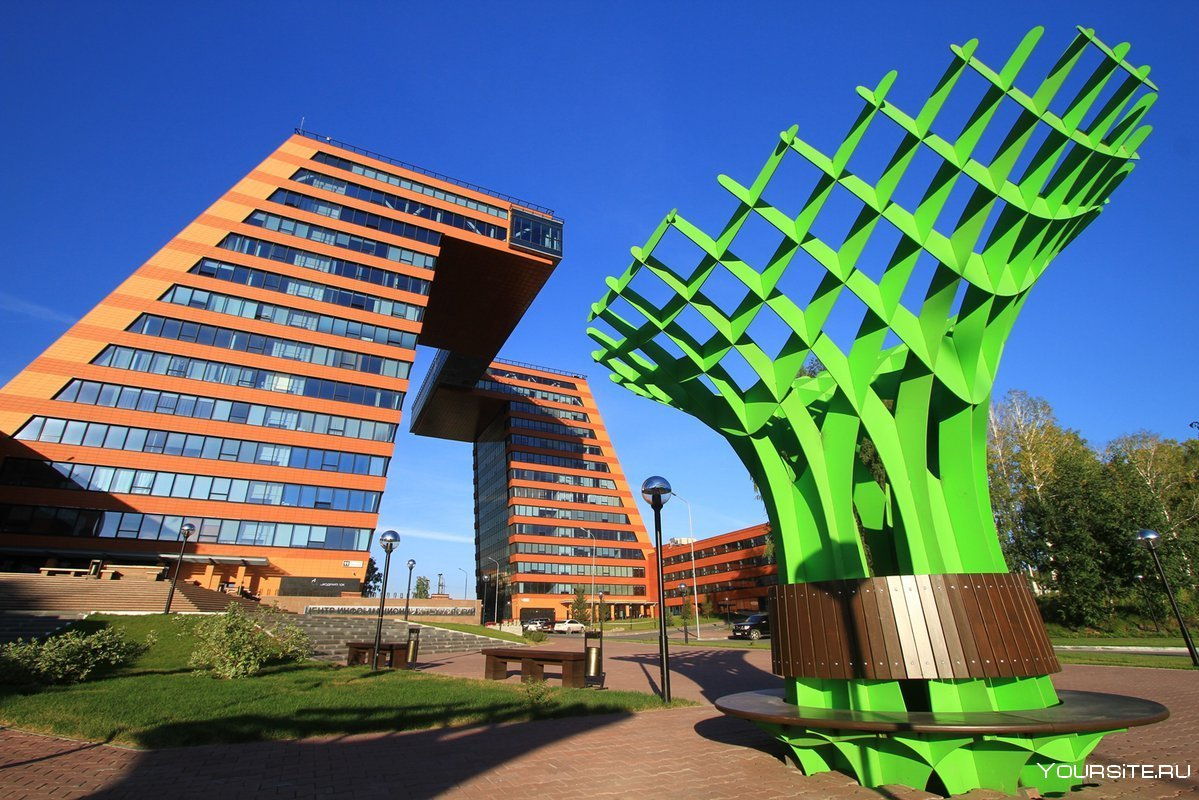
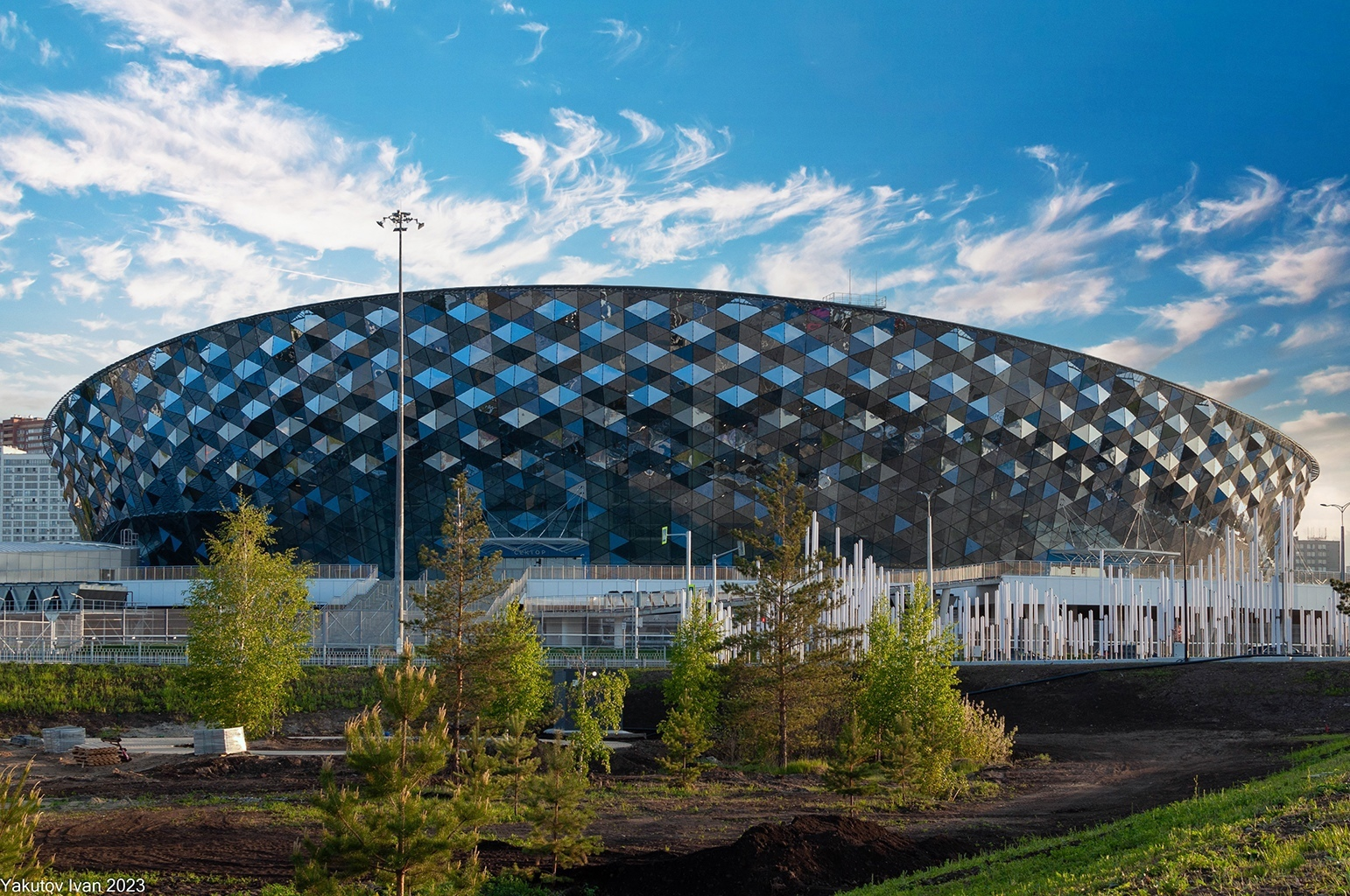
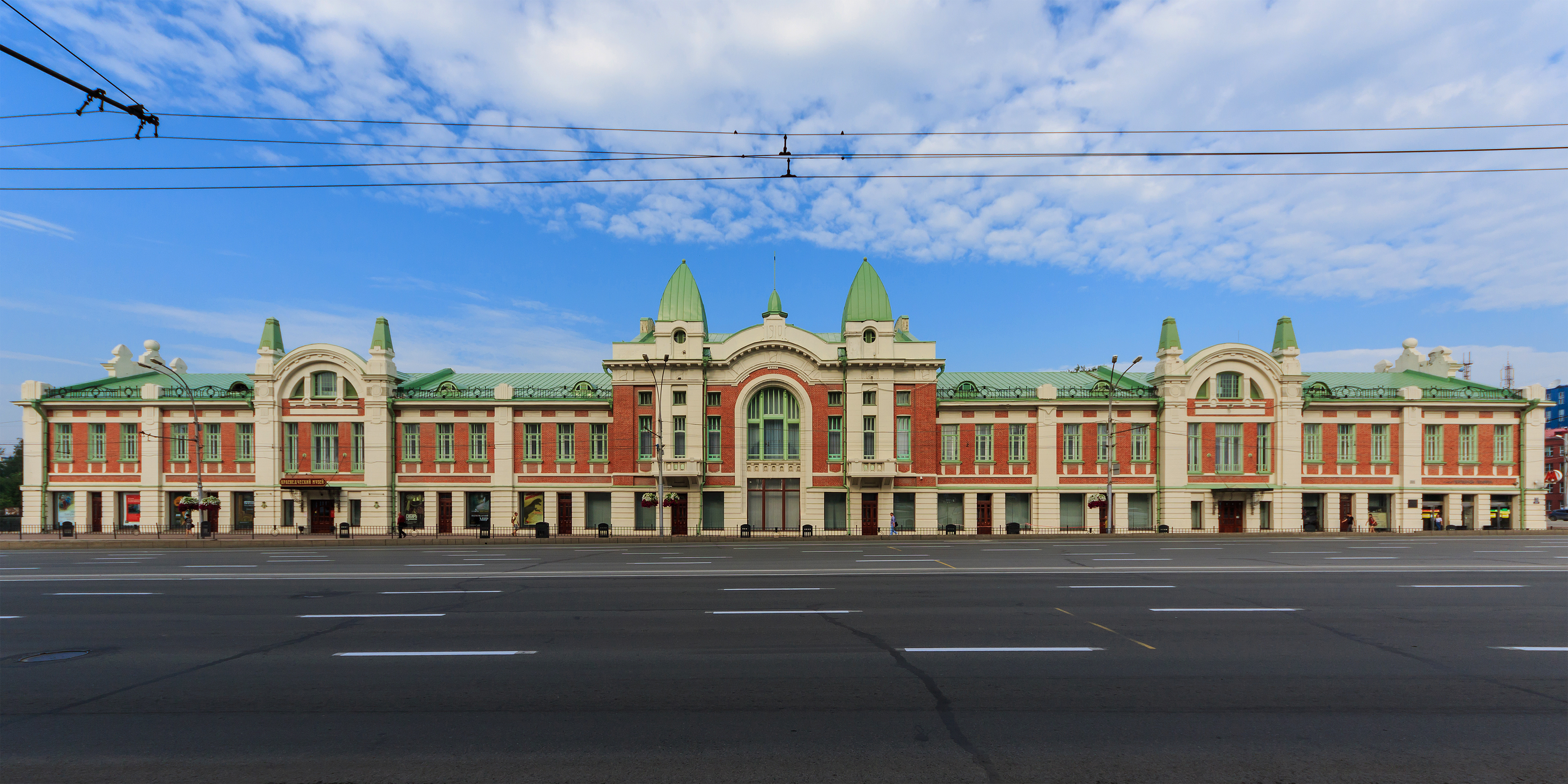
- Novosibirsk Opera and Ballet Theatre Novosibirsk railway station Novosibirsk State Circus Akadempark Sibir Arena City Trade House

- Flag Coat of arms
- Anthem: Anthem of Novosibirsk
- Interactive map of Novosibirsk
- Location of Novosibirsk Novosibirsk (Novosibirsk Oblast)
- Coordinates: 55°03′N 82°57′E
- Country: Russia
- Federal subject: Novosibirsk Oblast
- Founded: 1893
- City status since: January 10, 1904 [O.S. December 28, 1903]

Government
  - Body: Council of Deputies
  - Head: Maxim Kudryavtsev

Area
  - Total: 502.7 km^{2} (194.1 sq mi)
- Elevation: 153 m (502 ft)

Population (2021 Census)
  - Total: 1,633,595
  - Estimate (2025): 1,637,266 (+0.2%)
  - Rank: 3rd in 2021
  - Density: 3,250/km^{2} (8,417/sq mi)

Administrative status
  - Capital of: Novosibirsk Oblast, Novosibirsky District

Municipal status
  - Urban okrug: Novosibirsk Urban Okrug
  - Capital of: City of Novosibirsk, Novosibirsky Municipal District
- Time zone: UTC+7 (MSK+4)
- Postal codes: List 630000, 630001, 630003–630005, 630007–630011, 630015, 630017, 630019, 630020, 630022, 630024, 630025, 630027–630030, 630032–630037, 630039–630041, 630045–630049, 630051, 630052, 630054–630061, 630063, 630064, 630066, 630068, 630071, 630073, 630075, 630077–630080, 630082–630084, 630087–630092, 630095–630100, 630102, 630105–630112, 630114, 630116, 630117, 630119–630121, 630123, 630124, 630126, 630128, 630129, 630132, 630133, 630136, 630200, 630201, 630700, 630880, 630885, 630890, 630899–630901, 630910, 630920–630926, 630970–630978, 630980–630983, 630985, 630988, 630989, 630991–630993, 901026, 901036, 901073, 901076, 901078, 901095, 901243, 901245, 901246, 991214
- Dialing code: +7 383
- OKTMO ID: 50701000001
- City Day: Last Sunday of June
- Website: www.novo-sibirsk.ru

Novosibirsk (Note: /ˌnoʊvəsɪˈbɪərsk, -voʊs-/, also UK: /ˌnɒv-/; Russian: Новосиби́рск, IPA: [nəvəsʲɪˈbʲirsk]) is the administrative centre and largest city of Novosibirsk Oblast and the Siberian Federal District in Russia. As of the 2021 census, it had a population of 1,633,595, making it the third-most populous city in Russia after Moscow and Saint Petersburg. Additionally, it is the largest city in North Asia and the most populous Russian city that does not have the status of a federal subject. Novosibirsk is located in southwestern Siberia, on the banks of the Ob River.

Novosibirsk was founded in 1893 on the Ob River crossing point of the future Trans-Siberian Railway, where the Novosibirsk Rail Bridge was constructed. Originally named Novonikolayevsk (Note: Pre-reform orthography: Ново-Николаевскъ, IPA: [ˈnovə nʲɪkɐˈla(j)ɪfsk]) in honor of Emperor Nicholas II, the city rapidly grew into a major transport, commercial, and industrial hub. Novosibirsk was ravaged by the Russian Civil War but recovered during the early Soviet period and gained its present name, Novosibirsk, in 1926. Under the leadership of Joseph Stalin, Novosibirsk became one of the largest industrial centers of Siberia. Following the outbreak of World War II, the city hosted many factories relocated from the Russian core.

Novosibirsk is home to many notable places such as the neo-Byzantine Alexander Nevsky Cathedral, the Novosibirsk Opera and Ballet Theatre, as well as the Novosibirsk Zoo. It is served by Tolmachevo Airport, the busiest airport in Siberia.

== History ==
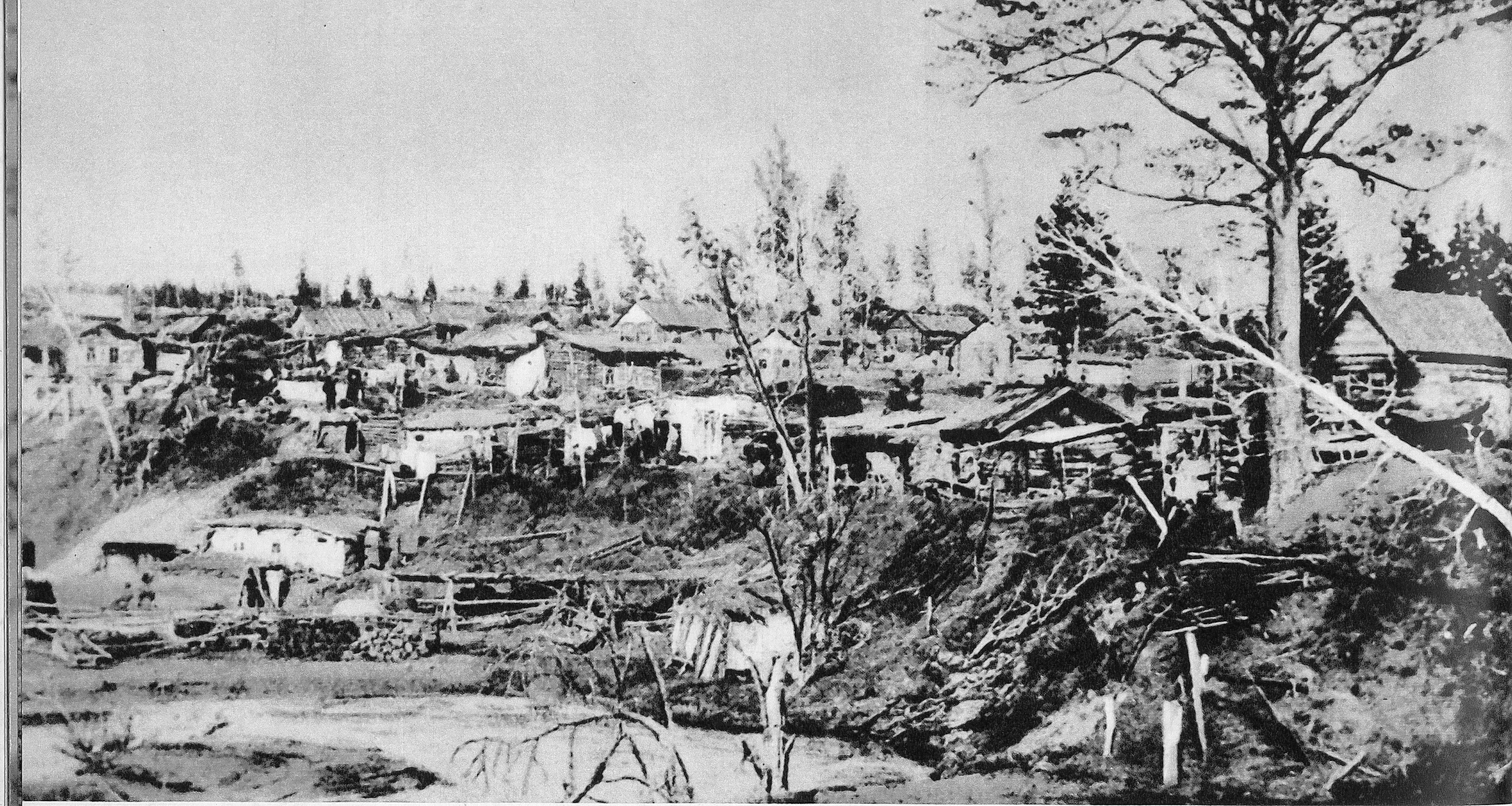
Novonikolayevsk in 1895

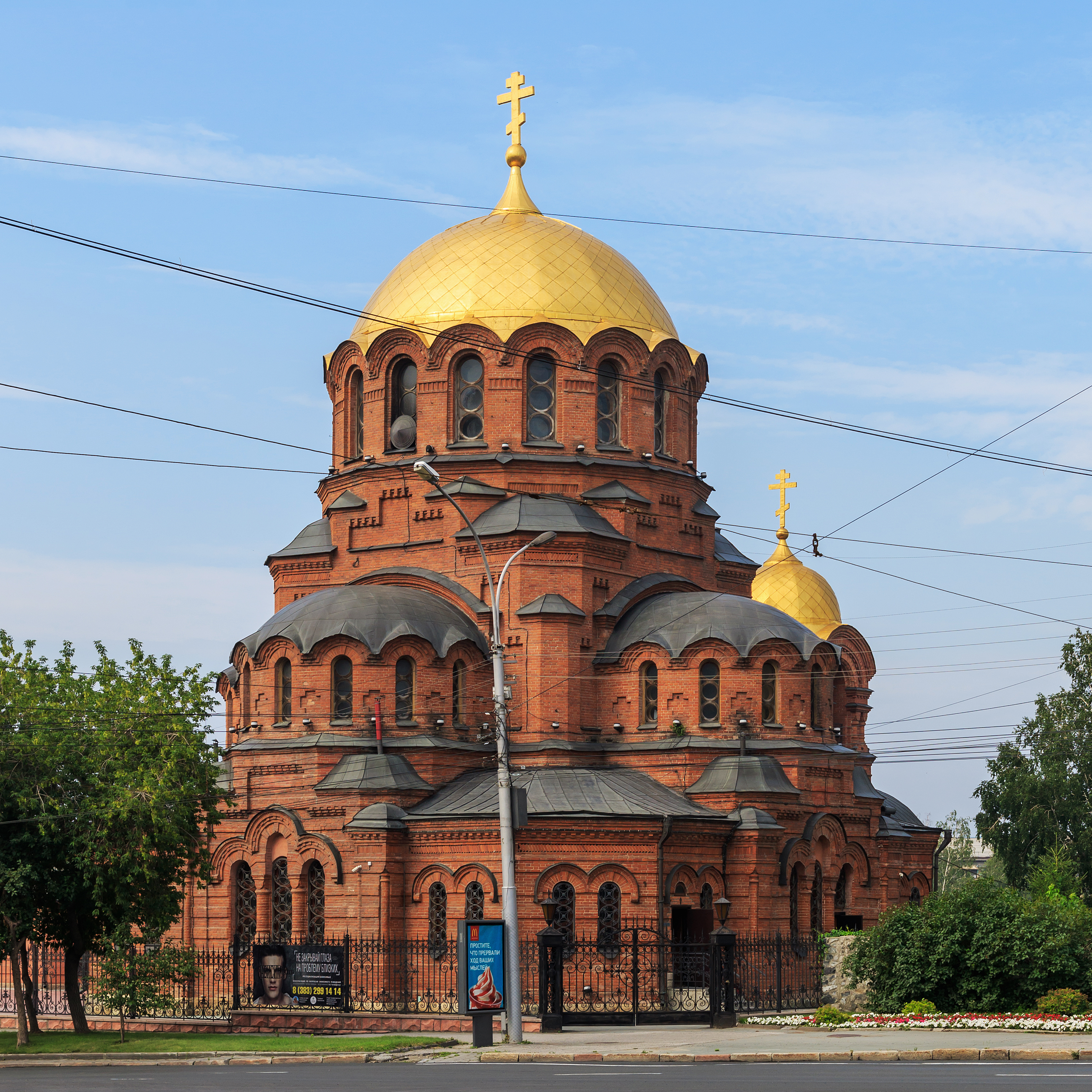
St Alexander Nevsky Cathedral

Novosibirsk was founded on the right side of the Ob, near an area traditionally inhabited by Chat Tatars (Chertovo gorodishche). The Russian town originated on 30 April 1893 at the future site of a Trans-Siberian Railway bridge crossing the great Siberian river, and in 1895 became known as Novonikolayevsk (Новониколаевск), in honor both of Saint Nicholas and of the new reigning Tsar, Nicholas II. It superseded Bolshoye Krivoshchyokovo village, located on the opposite side of the Ob, which was founded in 1696 and was resettled in 1893 due to the construction of the Novosibirsk Rail Bridge. The bridge, completed in the spring of 1897, made the new settlement a regional transport hub. The importance of the city further increased with the completion of the Turkestan–Siberia Railway in the early 20th century. The new railway connected Novonikolayevsk directly with Central Asia and the Caspian Sea.

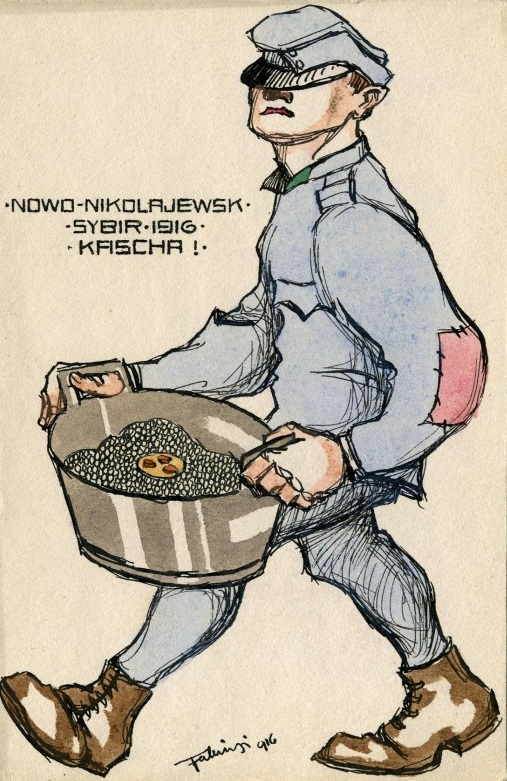
Art produced by a Czechoslovak prisoner-of-war in Novonikolayevsk, 1916.

At the time of the bridge's opening, Novonikolayevsk had a population of 7,800 people. The settlement developed rapidly. Its first bank opened in 1906, and a total of five banks were operating by 1915. In 1907, Novonikolayevsk, now with a population exceeding 47,000, was granted town status with full rights for self-government. During the pre-revolutionary period, the population of Novonikolayevsk reached 80,000. The city had steady and rapid economic growth, becoming one of the largest commercial and industrial centers of Siberia. It developed a significant agricultural-processing industry, as well as a power station, iron foundry, commodity market, several banks, and commercial and shipping companies. By 1917, the city had seven Orthodox churches and one Roman Catholic Church, along with several cinemas, forty primary schools, a high school, a teaching seminary, and the Romanov House non-classical secondary school. In 1913, Novonikolayevsk became one of the first places in Russia to institute compulsory primary education.

The Russian Civil War of 1917–1923 took a toll on the city. Wartime epidemics, especially typhus and cholera, claimed thousands of lives. In the course of the war, the Ob River Bridge was destroyed. For the first time in the city's history, the population of Novonikolayevsk began to decline. The Soviet Workers' and Soldiers' Deputies of Novonikolayevsk took control of the city in December 1917. In May 1918, the Czechoslovak Legion rose in opposition to the revolutionary government and, together with the White Guards, captured Novonikolayevsk (26 May 1918). The Red Army took the city in 1919, retaining it throughout the rest of the Civil War.

Novonikolayevsk began reconstruction in 1921 at the start of Lenin's New Economic Policy period (1921–1928). The city formed part of Tomsk Governorate and served as its administrative center from 23 December 1919 to 14 March 1920. Between 13 June 1921 and 25 May 1925, it served as the administrative center of Novonikolayevsk Governorate, which was separated from Tomsk Governorate. The city received its present name on 12 September 1926, -Novosibirsk, which, in the Russian language, translates roughly as "New Siberian [town]".

After the Soviet Union abolished governorates in 1929, the city served as the administrative center of the Siberian Krai until 23 July 1930, and of West Siberian Krai until 28 September 1937, when that krai was split into Novosibirsk Oblast and Altai Krai. Since then, it has served as the administrative center of Novosibirsk Oblast.

Between 1929 and 1951 the NKVD interrogation centre No. 1 in Novosibirsk was one of the main transit prisons in the USSR. In the 1990s there was a campaign to create a memorial on the site but remains found there were not reburied.

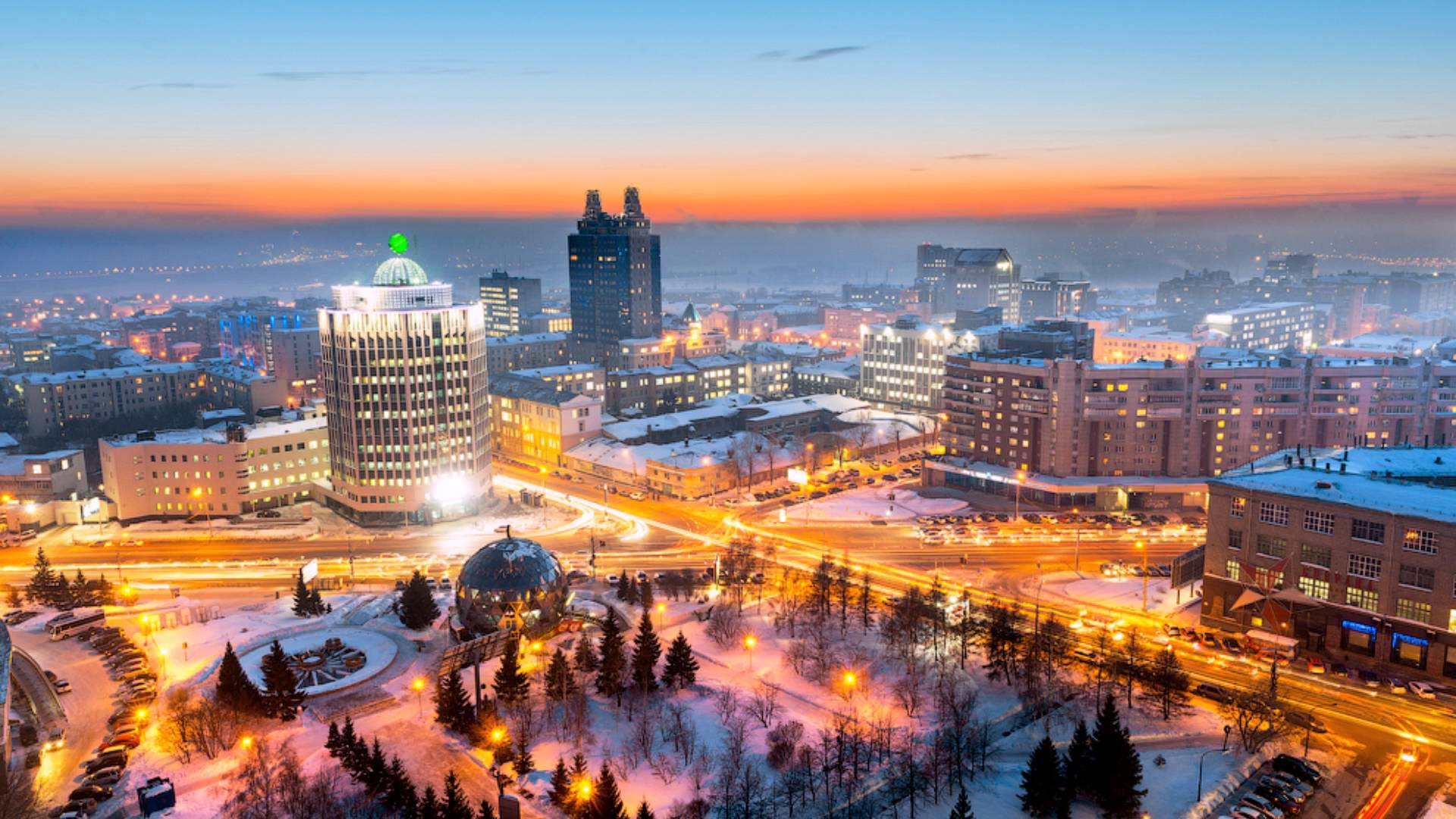
View of the part of Student Brigades Square and the intersection of Oktyabrskaya Highway, Serebrennikovskaya Street and Oktyabrskaya Street, as seen in 2017. In the lower left-hand corner, the part of the building of the Novosibirsk Globus Theatre is visible. In the center of the picture is the building at 50 Kommunisticheskaya Street, popularly known as "Batman" and "Plug".

The Monument to the Heroes of the Revolution, erected in the center of the city in 1922, became one of the chief historic sites (essentially every child had to visit the monument on school field-trips during the Soviet years). Neglect in the 1990s while other areas were redeveloped helped preserve it in the post-Soviet era.

During Stalin's industrialization effort, Novosibirsk secured its place as one of the largest industrial centers of Siberia. Several massive industrial facilities developed, including the 'Sibkombain' plant, specializing in the production of heavy mining equipment. Additionally, a metal-processing plant, a food-processing plant, and other industrial enterprises and factories were built, as well as a new power station. The great Soviet famine of 1932–33 resulted in more than 170,000 rural refugees seeking food and safety in Novosibirsk. They were settled in barracks at the outskirts of the city, giving rise to slums. Reflecting international recognition of its rapid growth and industrialization, in the US media Novosibirsk was referred to as the "Chicago of Siberia".

Tram rails were laid down in 1934, by which time the population had reached 287,000, making Novosibirsk the largest city in Siberia. The following year the original road bridge over the Ob River was replaced by the new Kommunalny bridge.

Between 1941 and 1942, the Soviets crated up and relocated more than 50 substantial factories from western Russia to Novosibirsk in order to reduce the risk of their destruction through war, and at this time the city became a major supply base for the Red Army. During this period the city also received more than 140,000 refugees.

The rapid growth of the city prompted the construction during the 1950s of a hydroelectric power station with a capacity of 400 megawatts, necessitating the creation of a giant water reservoir, now known as the Ob Sea. As a direct result of the station's construction, vast areas of fertile land were flooded, as were relic pine woods in the area; additionally, the new open space created by the reservoir's surface caused average wind speeds to double, increasing the rate of soil erosion.

In the 1950s, the Soviet Government directed the building of a center for scientific research in Novosibirsk, and in 1957 the multi-facility scientific research complex of Akademgorodok was constructed about 30 km (19 mi) south of the city center. The Siberian Division of the Russian Academy of Sciences (formerly the Academy of Sciences of the Soviet Union) has its headquarters in Akademgorodok, and the town hosts more than 35 research institutes and universities, among them Novosibirsk State University, one of the top Russian schools in natural sciences and mathematics. Although it possesses a fully autonomous infrastructure, Akademgorodok is administered by Novosibirsk.

On 2 September 1962, the population of Novosibirsk reached one million. At that time, it was the youngest city in the world with the population exceeding one million. Novosibirsk took fewer than seventy years to achieve this milestone. On 8 June 1965, the city was the scene of a dramatic aerial stunt when Lieutenant Valentin Privalov flew his MiG-17 under the October Bridge; an image which purportedly showed the event was later found to be a photocollage. In 1979, work began on the Novosibirsk Metro Transit System, culminating in the opening of the first line in 1985.

On 1 August 2008, Novosibirsk was in the center of the path of a solar eclipse, with a duration of 2 minutes and 20 seconds.

== Administrative and municipal status ==
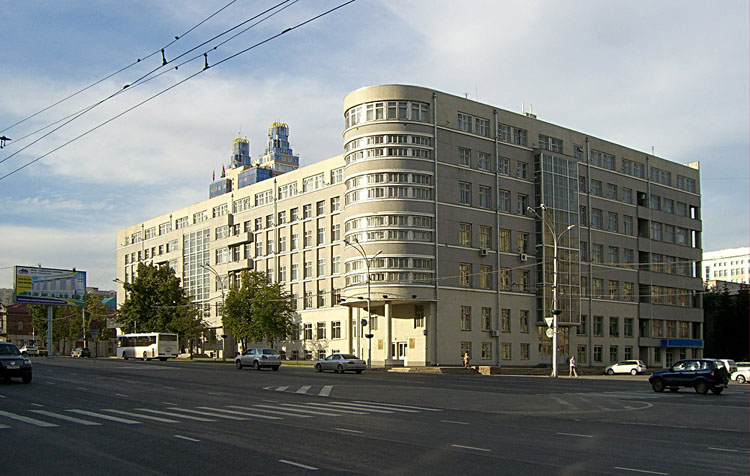
The administrative building of Novosibirsk Oblast

Novosibirsk is the administrative center of the oblast and, within the framework of administrative divisions, it also serves as the administrative center of Novosibirsky District, even though it is not a part of it. As an administrative division, it is incorporated separately as the City of Novosibirsk—an administrative unit with the status equal to that of the districts. As a municipal division, the City of Novosibirsk is incorporated as Novosibirsk Urban Okrug.

=== City districts ===
The Administrative divisions of Novosibirsk consists of 10 districts:

- Dzerzhinsky (Дзержинский)
- Kalininsky (Калининский)
- Kirovsky (Кировский)
- Leninsky (Ленинский)
- Oktyabrsky (Октябрьский)
- Pervomaysky (Первомайский)
- Sovetsky (Советский)
- Tsentralny (Центральный)
- Zayeltsovsky (Заельцовский)
- Zheleznodorozhny (Железнодорожный)

== Demographics ==
Historical population
| Year | Pop. | ±% |
|---|---|---|
| 1897 | 8,000 | — |
| 1926 | 117,863 | +1373.3% |
| 1939 | 405,297 | +243.9% |
| 1959 | 885,045 | +118.4% |
| 1970 | 1,160,963 | +31.2% |
| 1979 | 1,312,480 | +13.1% |
| 1989 | 1,436,516 | +9.5% |
| 2002 | 1,425,508 | −0.8% |
| 2010 | 1,473,754 | +3.4% |
| 2021 | 1,633,595 | +10.8% |
| 2024 | 1,633,851 | +0.0% |
Source: Census data

According to the 2021 Russian census, the population of Novosibirsk is 1,633,595. This is an increase compared to the 2010 census, when the population of the city was 1,473,754.

People from over eighty ethnicities and nationalities reside in Novosibirsk. The largest groups are Russian, Tajik, Tatar, Uzbek, Ukrainian and Kyrgyz.

| Ethnic group | Population | Percentage |
|---|---|---|
| Russians | 1,161,185 | 93.9% |
| Tajiks | 6,502 | 0.5% |
| Tatars | 6,213 | 0.5% |
| Uzbeks | 5,665 | 0.5% |
| Ukrainians | 5,436 | 0.4% |
| Kyrgyz | 5,421 | 0.4% |
| Other | 45,864 | 3.7% |

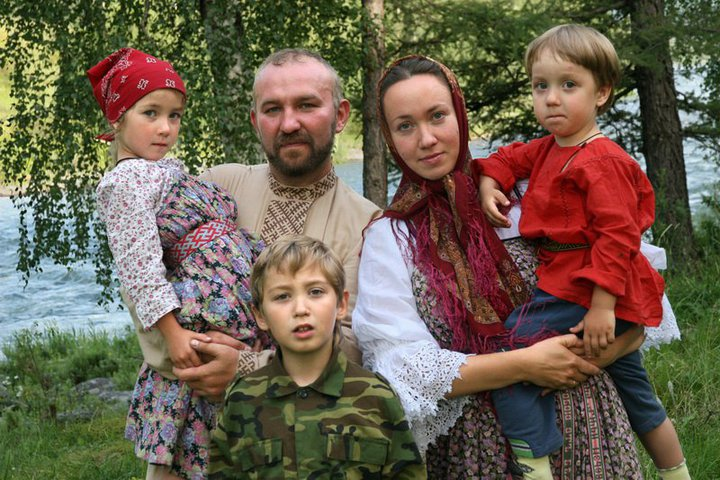
Siberian Cossack family in Novosibirsk, after 2000

== Ecology ==
=== Flora ===
The best-known trees native to Novosibirsk are birch, pine, and aspen. Some mountain ash, hawthorn, spruce, and fir are present as well. European species of apple, ash, elm, linden, and oak have been successfully introduced.

== Geography ==
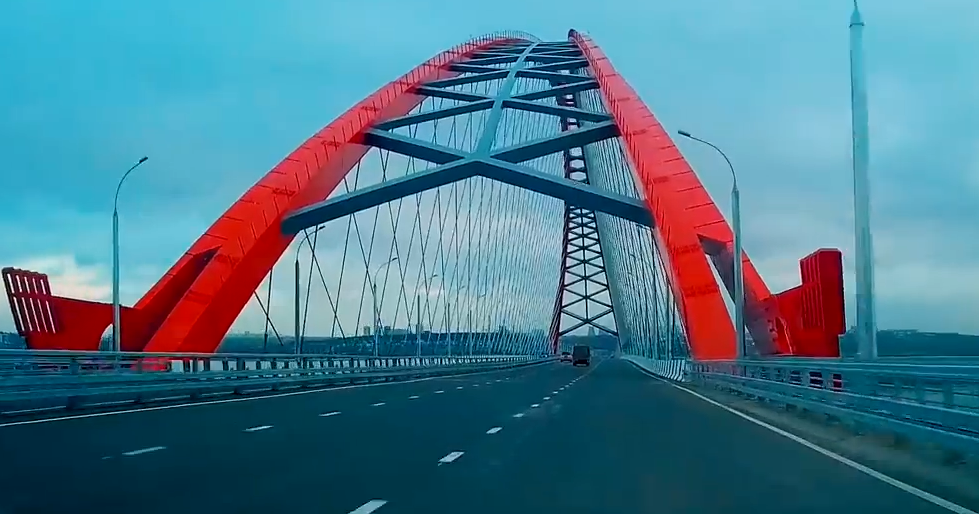
Bugrinsky Bridge on the Ob River

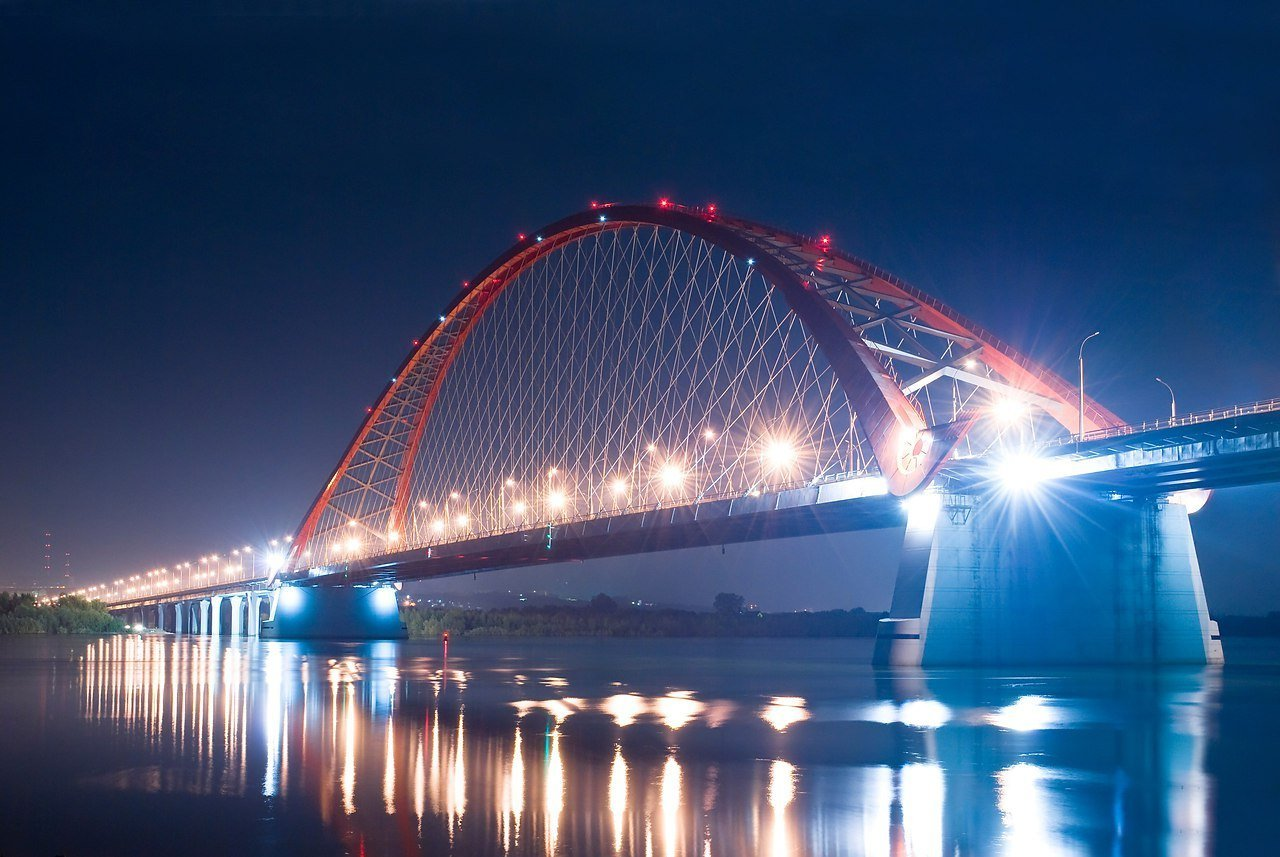
Bugrinsky Bridge at Night

=== Urban layout ===
The layout of the modern city is based on the planning of the post-revolution period. Before 1917, there was no traditional city center in Novo-Nikolayevsk. The main buildings of the railway management and the nearby railway station as well as the most important cathedral and the complex of the city's government were spread throughout the city. This changed following the revolution, with Lenin House built in 1925 in what was traditionally the main avenue, Krasny Prospekt while the first Lenin monument was built in Barnaulskaya Street, closer to the railway station. And thus, until the late 1920s, Novosibirsk did not have a clearly defined city center. The 1930s brought many changes to the development of the city: Its former Bazarnaya Ploschad (Market Square) was chosen as the site for the construction of the Opera House which started in 1931. The Stalin Park of Culture and Rest was established some distance from the main avenue and the city's administrative buildings and park created a radial around the Bazarnaya Ploschad.

There are 4 road (Kommunalny, Dimitrovsky, Bugrinsky, Novo-Nikolaevsky) 2 railway (First, Komsomolsky), and 1 metro bridges within the city limits. The dam of the Novosibirsk Hydroelectric Station located on the territory of the city is also used for road traffic.

=== Location ===
The city stands on the banks of the Ob River in the West Siberian Plain. The southern boundary of the city runs through the Novosibirsk reservoir, which is formed by the dam of the Novosibirsk Hydroelectric Station and cuts through the Ob Plateau.

The nearest major cities are Omsk, Barnaul, Kemerovo, Tomsk. Novosibirsk is located about 2,811 kilometres from Moscow.

=== Climate ===
The climate in Novosibirsk is typical of Siberia, with dry winters and far-below-freezing winter temperatures. Among the reasons for these temperatures are the absence of a nearby ocean and the lack of tall mountains at the north of Novosibirsk that could hold back freezing Arctic winds. In fact, Novosibirsk is the second-farthest substantially populated city from the ocean, the first being Ürümqi in China.

The climate is humid continental (Köppen Dfb), with warm summers and bitterly cold winters. Snow is frequent, falling on almost half of all winter days, but individual snowfalls are usually light. On average temperatures range in summer from +15 °C (59 °F) to +26 °C (79 °F) and in winter from −20 °C (−4 °F) to −12 °C (10 °F). However, winter temperatures can go as low as −30 °C (−22 °F) to −35 °C (−31 °F), and summer temperatures can go as high as +30 °C (86 °F) to +35 °C (95 °F). The difference between the highest- and lowest-recorded temperatures is 82 °C (148 °F).

Travellers coming from countries with mild climates may find Novosibirsk's winter extremely cold, but it is a lot less severe than further east in Siberia and the Russian Far East, especially considering its latitude of 55°N. For example, Novosibirsk is less cold during winter nights than Spassk-Dalny at eleven degrees lower latitude. It also is less cold in winter than the largest far eastern city of Khabarovsk and during nights even the Pacific coastal town of Sovetskaya Gavan, both at less than 49°N, and slightly milder than the Chinese city of Harbin, the capital of Manchuria and Heilongjiang province in China, at only 45°N. Sometimes bitter cold may hold for some days, but temperatures of −40 °C (−40 °F) and lower do not occur every year. Its overall temperatures are very similar to that of Winnipeg, Canada, at about 50 degrees north.

Climate data for Novosibirsk (1991–2020, extremes 1912–present)
| Month | Jan | Feb | Mar | Apr | May | Jun | Jul | Aug | Sep | Oct | Nov | Dec | Year |
|---|---|---|---|---|---|---|---|---|---|---|---|---|---|
| Record high °C (°F) | 4.1 (39.4) | 5.1 (41.2) | 14.4 (57.9) | 30.7 (87.3) | 36.1 (97.0) | 38.9 (102.0) | 36.4 (97.5) | 35.7 (96.3) | 33.2 (91.8) | 23.8 (74.8) | 11.9 (53.4) | 4.8 (40.6) | 38.9 (102.0) |
| Mean daily maximum °C (°F) | −12.6 (9.3) | −9.2 (15.4) | −1.3 (29.7) | 9.6 (49.3) | 18.9 (66.0) | 23.8 (74.8) | 25.4 (77.7) | 23.1 (73.6) | 16.1 (61.0) | 7.9 (46.2) | −3.4 (25.9) | −9.9 (14.2) | 7.4 (45.3) |
| Daily mean °C (°F) | −17.0 (1.4) | −14.4 (6.1) | −6.8 (19.8) | 3.6 (38.5) | 11.9 (53.4) | 17.6 (63.7) | 19.5 (67.1) | 16.9 (62.4) | 10.3 (50.5) | 3.3 (37.9) | −6.8 (19.8) | −13.9 (7.0) | 2.0 (35.6) |
| Mean daily minimum °C (°F) | −21.2 (−6.2) | −19.1 (−2.4) | −11.9 (10.6) | −1.4 (29.5) | 5.7 (42.3) | 11.7 (53.1) | 13.9 (57.0) | 11.5 (52.7) | 5.7 (42.3) | −0.2 (31.6) | −10.1 (13.8) | −18 (0) | −2.8 (27.0) |
| Record low °C (°F) | −51.1 (−60.0) | −47.6 (−53.7) | −40 (−40) | −29 (−20) | −8.6 (16.5) | −2.0 (28.4) | 3.9 (39.0) | 0.2 (32.4) | −6.9 (19.6) | −26.4 (−15.5) | −39.6 (−39.3) | −45.7 (−50.3) | −51.1 (−60.0) |
| Average precipitation mm (inches) | 25 (1.0) | 18 (0.7) | 20 (0.8) | 24 (0.9) | 37 (1.5) | 55 (2.2) | 68 (2.7) | 58 (2.3) | 46 (1.8) | 43 (1.7) | 39 (1.5) | 36 (1.4) | 465 (18.3) |
| Average rainy days | 1 | 1 | 2 | 8 | 13 | 14 | 14 | 14 | 16 | 12 | 5 | 1 | 101 |
| Average snowy days | 23 | 19 | 15 | 9 | 3 | 0.1 | 0 | 0 | 1 | 11 | 20 | 25 | 126 |
| Average relative humidity (%) | 82 | 81 | 77 | 65 | 58 | 66 | 73 | 75 | 75 | 78 | 83 | 83 | 75 |
| Mean monthly sunshine hours | 67 | 107 | 166 | 213 | 264 | 302 | 304 | 245 | 170 | 100 | 58 | 45 | 2,041 |
Source 1: Pogoda.ru.net
Source 2: Danish Meteorological Institute (sun, 1931–1960)

Climate data for Novosibirsk (1961–1990)
| Month | Jan | Feb | Mar | Apr | May | Jun | Jul | Aug | Sep | Oct | Nov | Dec | Year |
|---|---|---|---|---|---|---|---|---|---|---|---|---|---|
| Mean daily maximum °C (°F) | −12.2 (10.0) | −10.3 (13.5) | −2.6 (27.3) | 8.1 (46.6) | 17.5 (63.5) | 24.0 (75.2) | 25.7 (78.3) | 22.2 (72.0) | 16.6 (61.9) | 6.8 (44.2) | −2.9 (26.8) | −8.9 (16.0) | 7.0 (44.6) |
| Daily mean °C (°F) | −16.2 (2.8) | −14.7 (5.5) | −7.2 (19.0) | 3.2 (37.8) | 11.6 (52.9) | 18.2 (64.8) | 20.2 (68.4) | 17.0 (62.6) | 11.5 (52.7) | 3.4 (38.1) | −6.0 (21.2) | −12.7 (9.1) | 2.4 (36.3) |
| Mean daily minimum °C (°F) | −20.1 (−4.2) | −19.1 (−2.4) | −11.8 (10.8) | −1.7 (28.9) | 5.6 (42.1) | 12.3 (54.1) | 14.7 (58.5) | 11.7 (53.1) | 6.4 (43.5) | 0.0 (32.0) | −9.1 (15.6) | −16.4 (2.5) | −2.3 (27.9) |
| Average precipitation mm (inches) | 19 (0.7) | 14 (0.6) | 15 (0.6) | 24 (0.9) | 36 (1.4) | 58 (2.3) | 72 (2.8) | 66 (2.6) | 44 (1.7) | 38 (1.5) | 32 (1.3) | 24 (0.9) | 442 (17.4) |
Source: "Mean monthly climatic data for the city of Novosibirsk from 1961 to 1990". Roshydromet.

== Broadcasting ==
Novosibirsk is home to Russia's most powerful shortwave relay station east of the Ural Mountains. This relay station can reach most of South Asia, West Asia, and China. The Magadan and Vladivostok relay stations, when operated in conjunction with Novosibirsk can guarantee that the Voice of Russia, or any other broadcaster renting time at Novosibirsk is heard in the intended target area.

== Transportation ==
=== International and intercity transportation ===
==== Airports ====
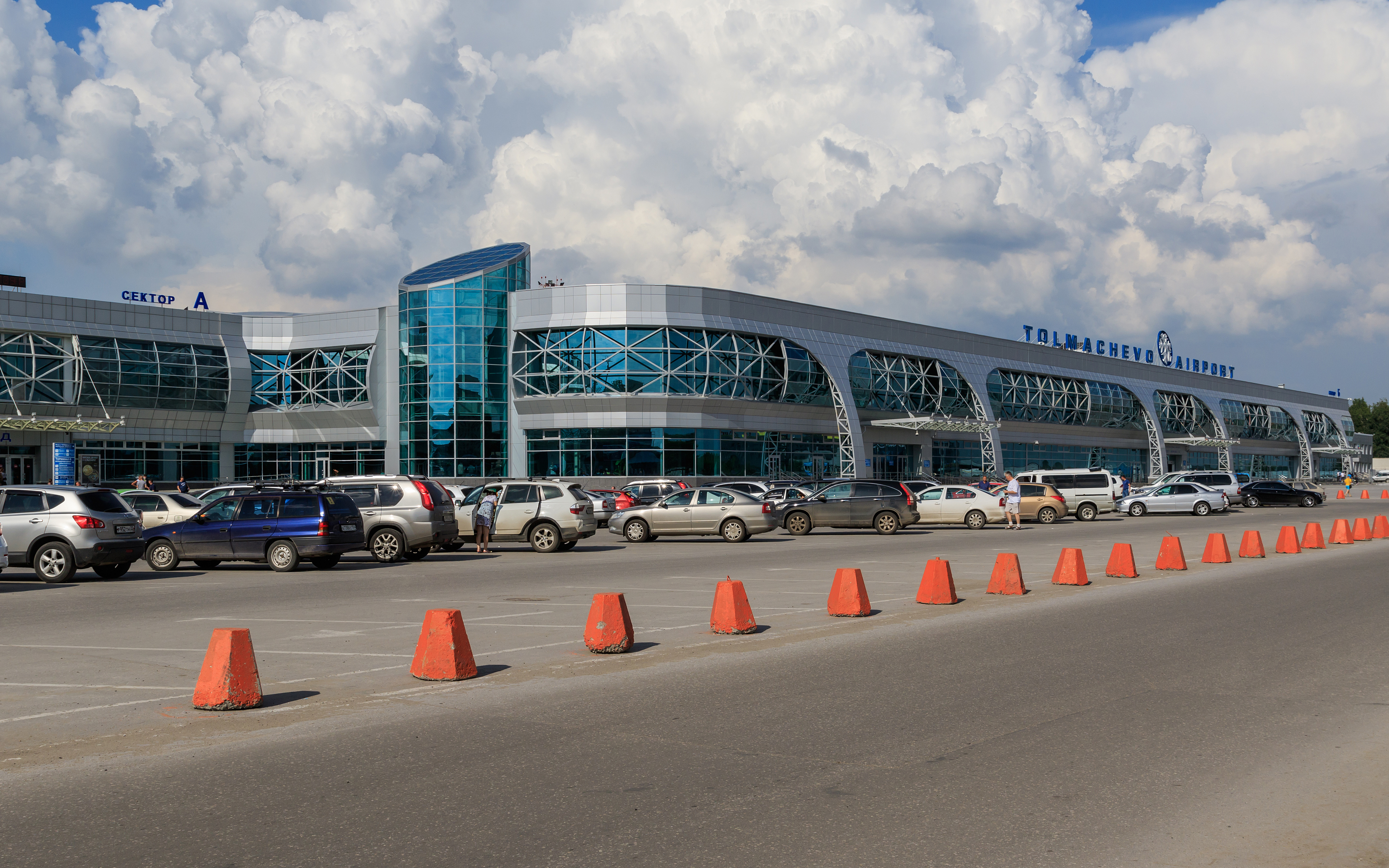
Tolmachevo Airport

The city is served by Novosibirsk Tolmachevo Airport, which connects Novosibirsk with most of Russia's largest cities and most countries of Europe and Asia. Tolmachevo is the hub for S7 Airlines.

There is also the auxiliary Yeltsovka Airport.

A smaller field for general aviation at Novosibirsk Severny Airport was closed in 2012. In August 2008, the First World Aerobatics Championship in Yak-52 aircraft was held at the airport.

==== Railway stations ====
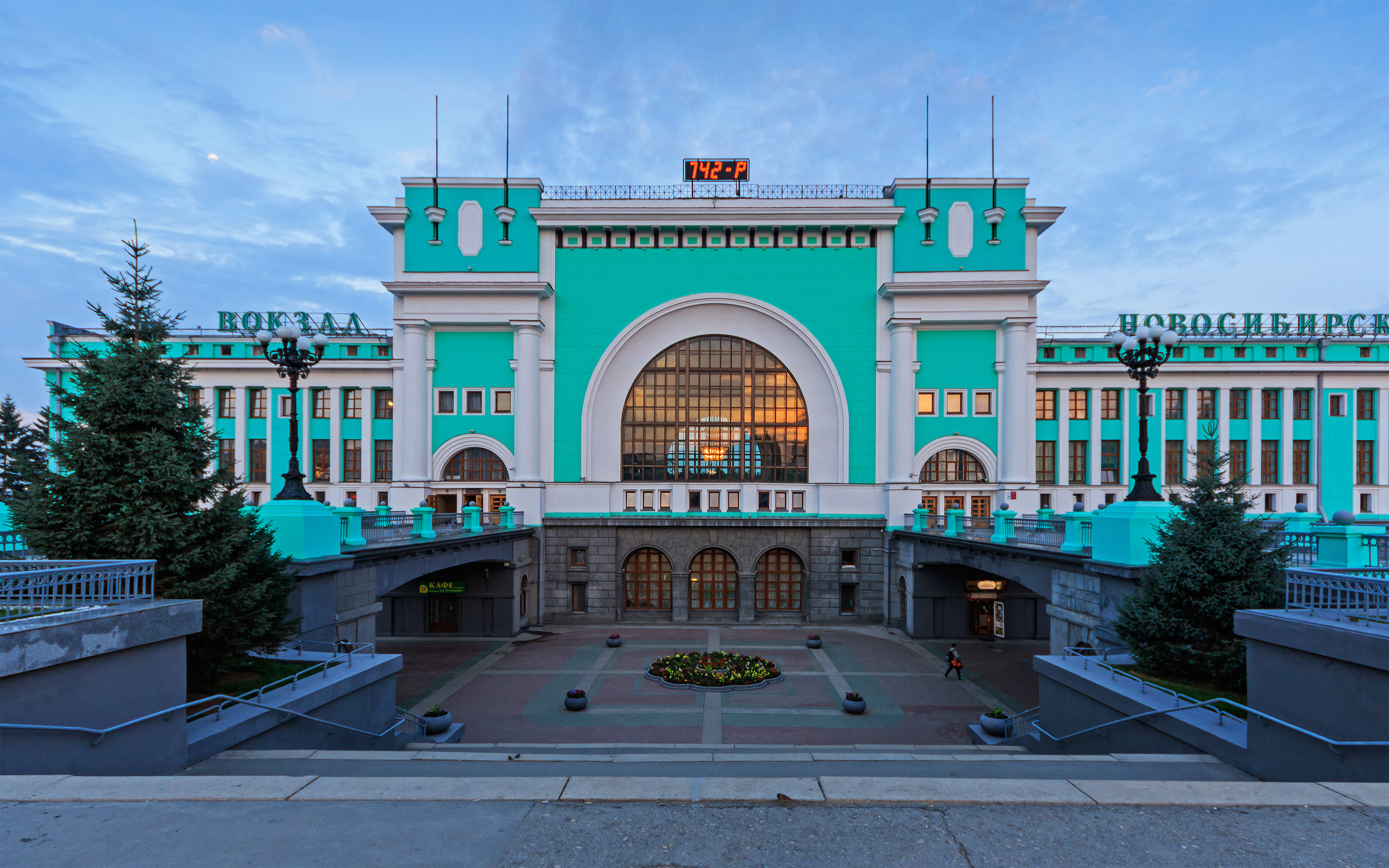
Novosibirsk-Glavny railway station

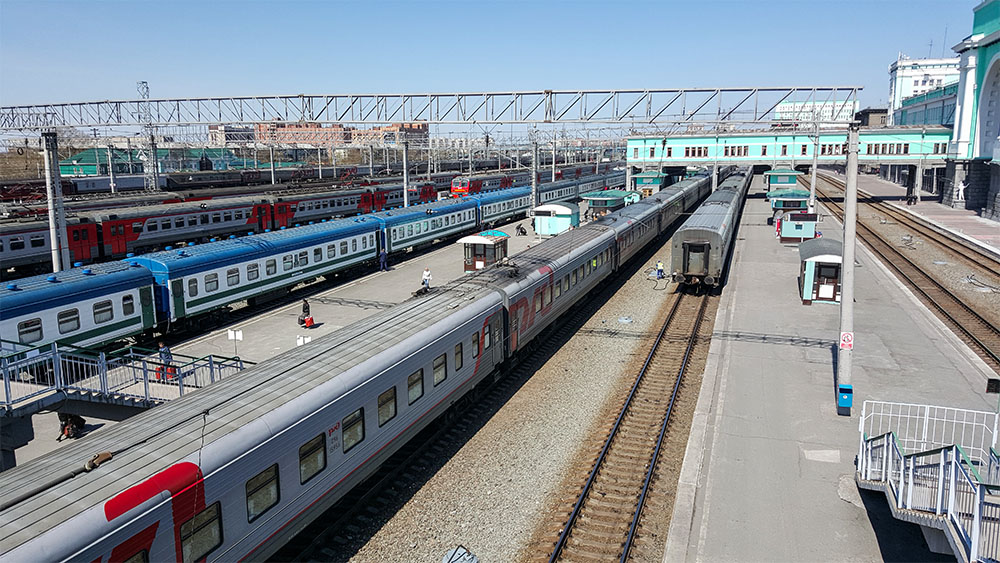
Trains at Novosibirsk-Glavny railway station

Novosibirsk is a major stop on the Trans-Siberian Railway and the north end of Turkestan–Siberia Railway. The main railway station of Novosibirsk is Novosibirsk-Glavny station ("Glavny" means "Main") which is located in the centre of the right bank part of the city. There are also Novosibirsk-Zapadny ("Zapadny" means "Western"), Novosibirsk-Vostochny ("Vostochny" means "Eastern"), and Novosibirsk-Yuzhny ("Yuzhny" means "Southern") railway stations in Novosibirsk. All intercity trains passing through the aforementioned stations stop at these stations. In addition, there are halts where only suburban trains stops, for example Inskaya, Seyatel, Razyezd Inya, and many others.

The many regular intercity trains connect Novosibirsk with Russian cities in Siberia, the Far East, Ural, and European Russia. International trains connect the city with China, Mongolia, Belarus, and countries in Central Asia.

==== Bus stations ====
The old Novosibirsk Bus Station located on Krasny Avenue in the right bank part of the city near Kommunalny Bridge was opened in 1964 and eventually closed on 6 April 2020. There is a plan to build some new bus stations on the periphery of the city; the first of these new bus stations was built on Gusinobrodskoe Сhaussee and was opened on 18 December 2019. Until the completion of remaining new bus stations, some bus stops in the city are being used by intercity bus services.

The many regular intercity/international bus routes connect Novosibirsk with most cities of the southern part of Western Siberia and major cities of Central Asia.

==== River passenger terminals ====
The building of Novosibirsk river passenger terminal on the Ob river was opened in 1974. Later, the self-titled metro station was opened near the building of the terminal. On 7 March 2003, there was the strong fire in the building of the terminal. The part of the building was beyond repair and was demolished.

At present day, only two regular passenger lines are operational: Novosibirsk – Kudryash island – Yagodnaya – Cheremushki – Novaya Zarya – Bibikha – Sedova Zaimka and Novosibirsk – Berdsk. There are also cruises on the Ob river and the Novosibirsk Reservoir including to Tomsk and Barnaul. River ships use the Novosibirsk Shipping Canal, equipped with a single triple-chamber shipping lock and located in Novosibirsk along its entire length, for the passage from the river to the reservoir and from the reservoir to the river.

Usually, the period of navigability is opened in late April or early May and is closed in late September or early October.

=== City public transportation ===
==== Metro ====
Сhronologically, Novosibirsk was the fourth city in Russia in which a metro system was established, after Moscow, Saint Petersburg, and Nizhny Novgorod. It was therefore also the first city in Siberia. The Novosibirsk Metro was opened in 1985. As of 2022, the system has 2 dual track lines (Leninskaya (red) and Dzerzhinskaya (green)) and 14 stations.

==== Tram system ====
The Novosibirsk tram system was launched in 1934. As of 2022, the network has 10 routes: 6 of them are situated in left-bank part of the city, 4 of them are situated in right-bank of the city.

==== Trolleybus system ====
The Novosibirsk trolleybus system was launched in 1957. As of 2022, the network has 14 routes.

==== Bus system ====
The Novosibirsk bus system was launched in 1923. As of 2022, system consists of 52 routes served by buses over 10 metres long and 17 routes served by smaller buses.

==== Waterbus system ====
As of 2021, the Novosibirsk waterbus system includes the following routes:

- Novosibirsk river passenger terminal – Beach "Bugrinskaya Roshcha" – Korablik Island
- Novosibirsk river passenger terminal – Severo-Chemskoy residential area – Allotment garden community "Smorodinka" – Allotment garden community "Tikhie Zori"
- Novosibirsk river passenger terminal – Novosibirsk Waterpark (the last route was not included in the plan of navigational season 2021 due to suspension of Waterpark's operation).

Usually, the period of navigability is opened in late April or early May and is closed in late September or early October.

==== Route taxi ====
The Novosibirsk fixed-route taxi system (marshrutka), which utilizes minibuses, has operated in the city since late 1970s. In 1989, the first private carriers appeared after the passage of the Law on Cooperatives. There are 56 marshrutkas routes in Novosibirsk. In recent years the number of minibus routes in this system have been in decline, generally being replaced with bus routes.

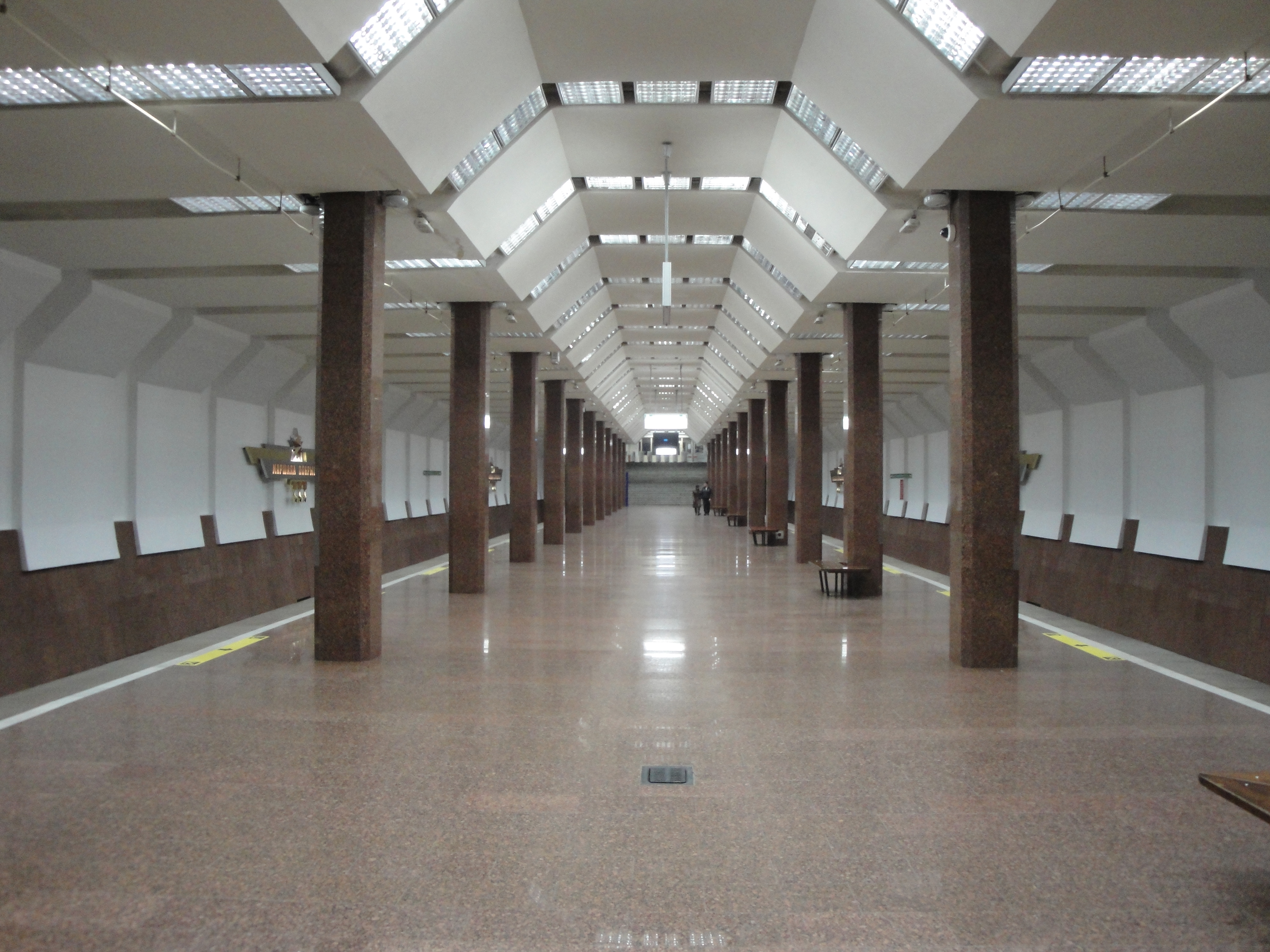
Marshal Pokryshkin metro station

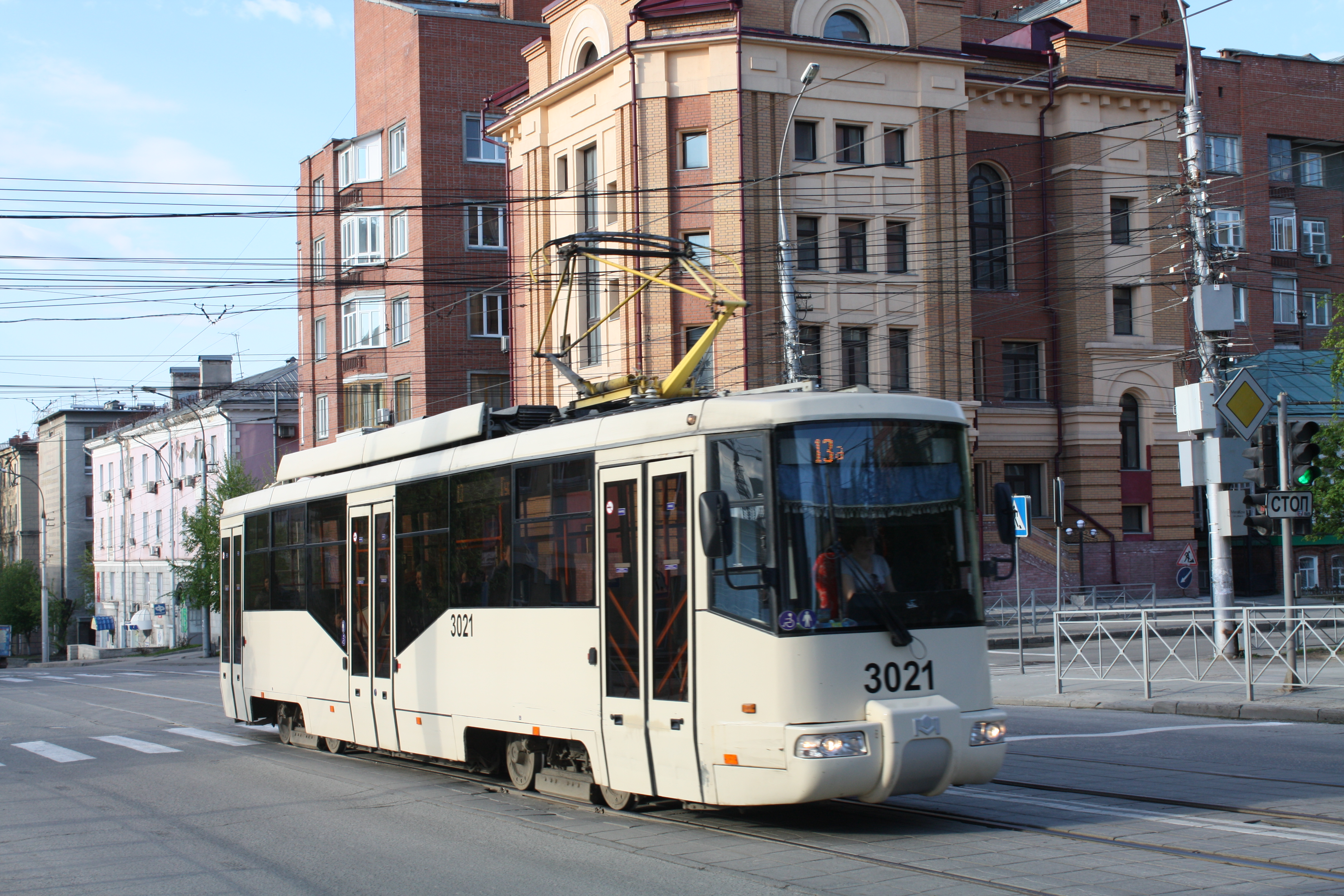
BKM-60103 tram

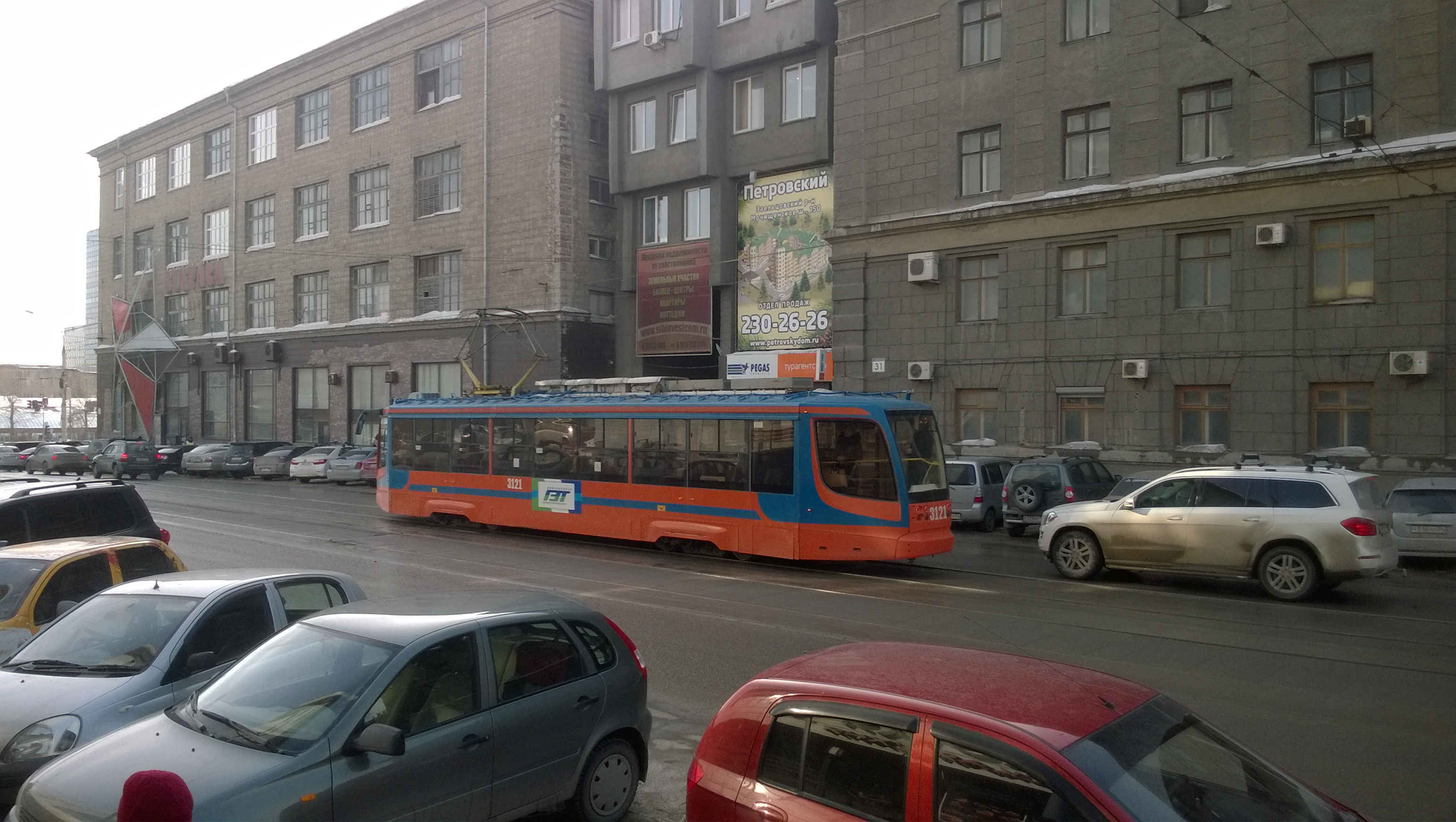
71-623 (UKVZ) tram

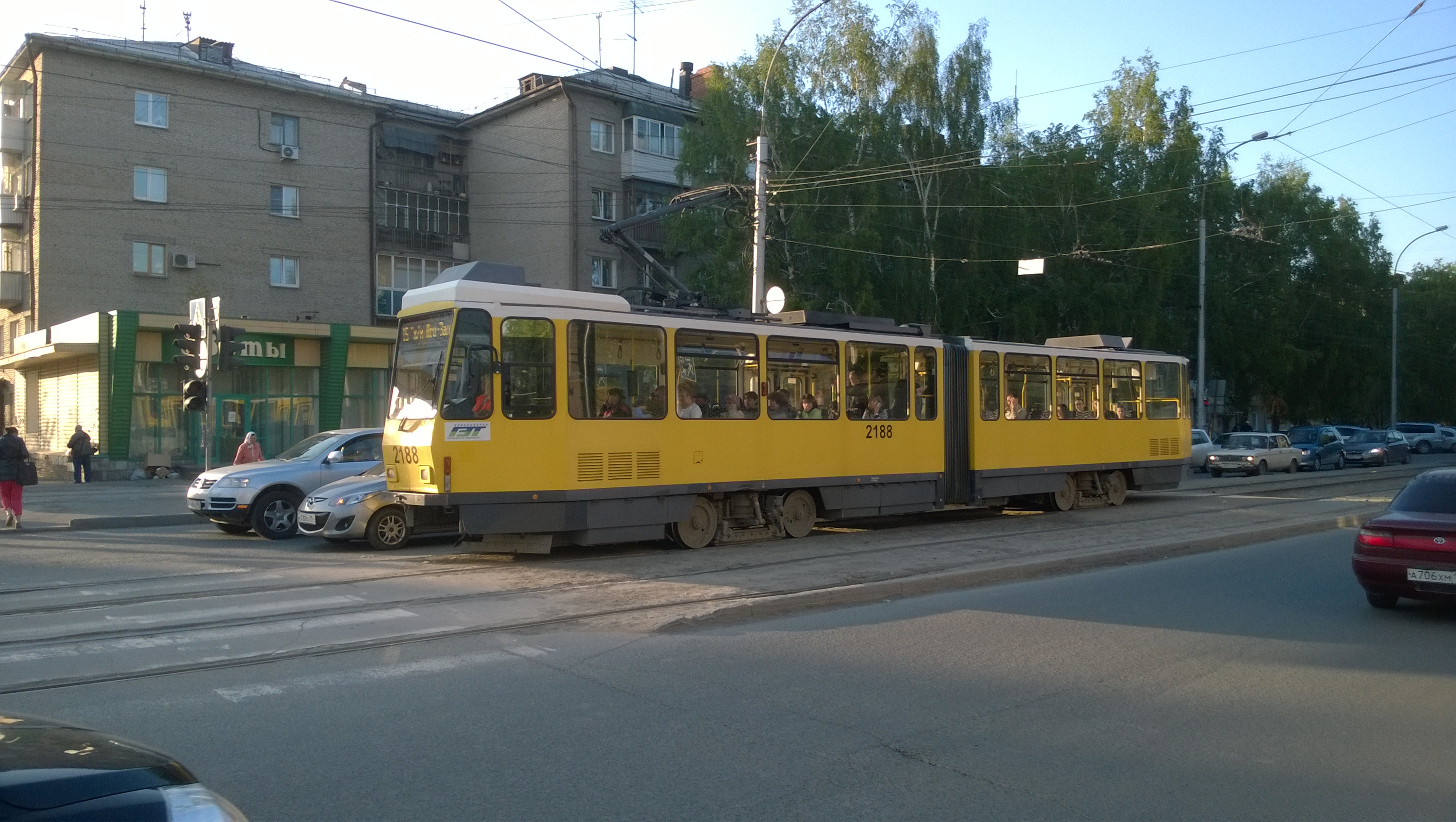
Tatra KT4DM tram

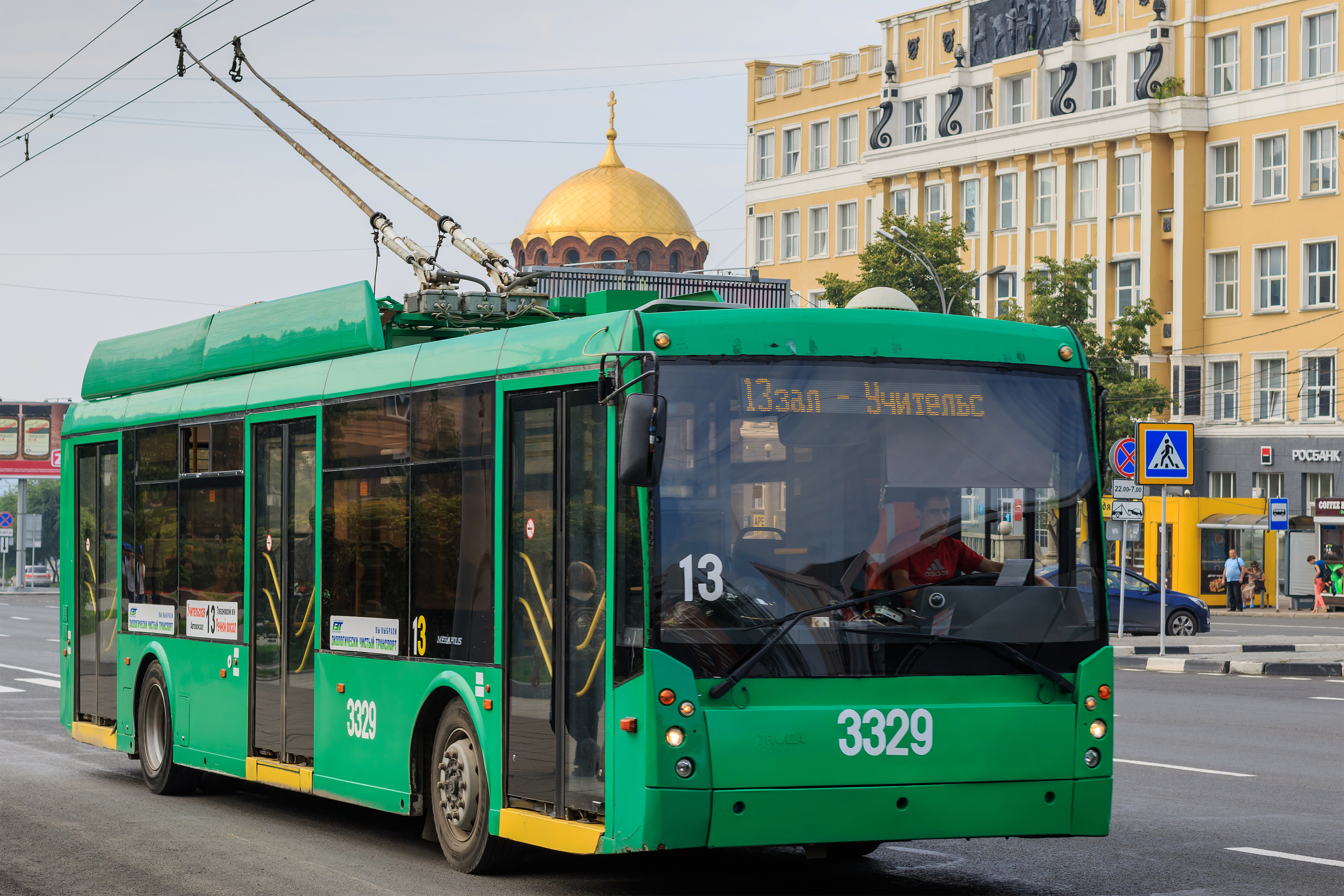
Trolza-5265 low-floor trolleybus

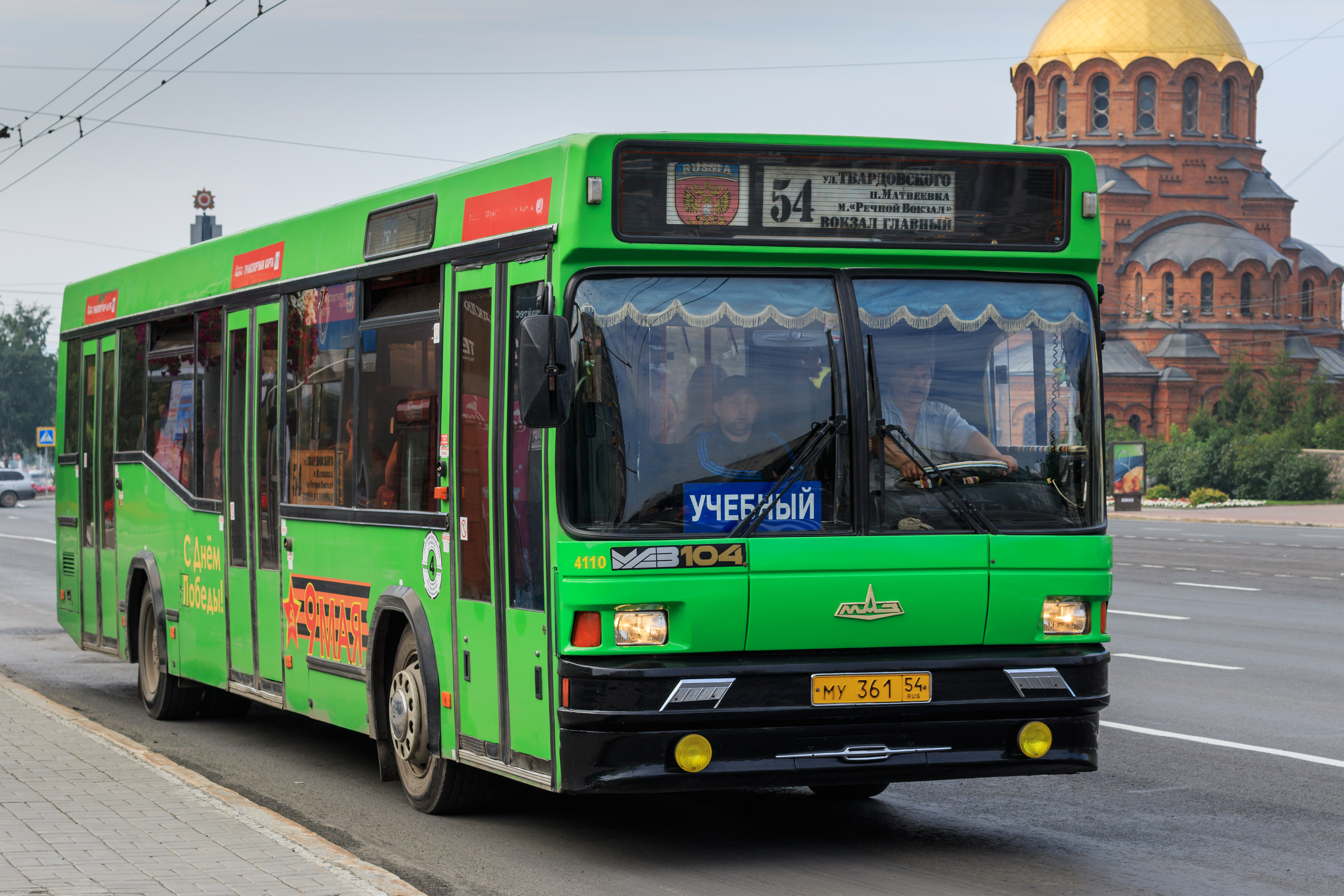
MAZ-103 low-entry bus

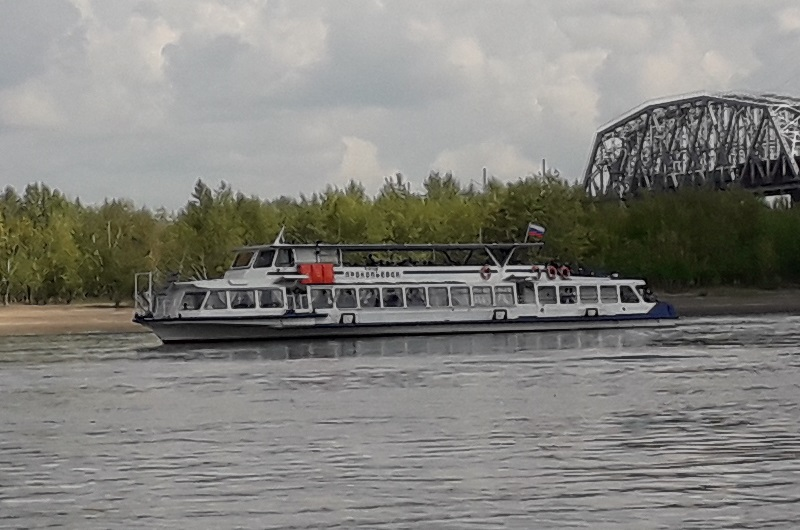
Waterbus Moskva type on the Ob

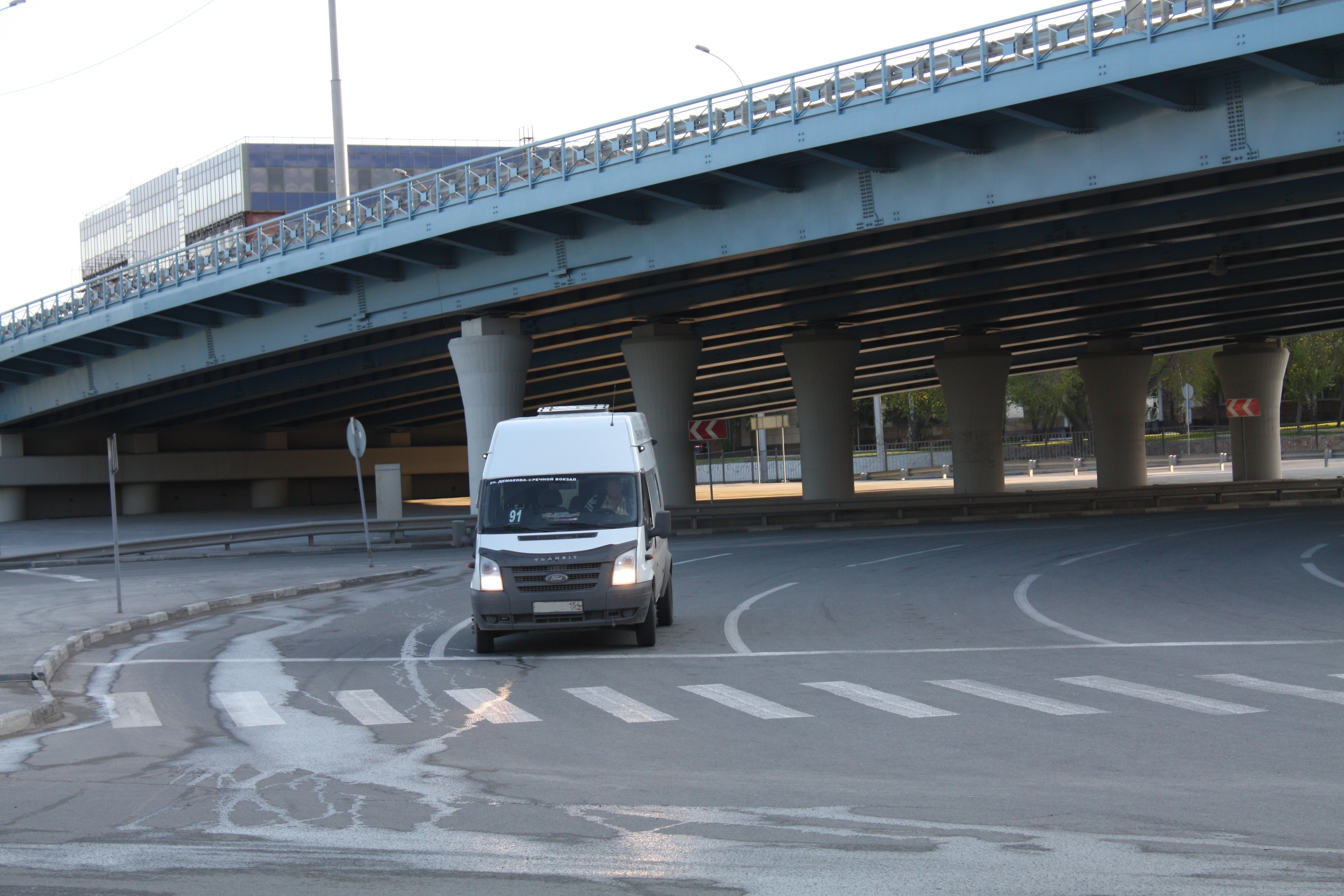
Ford Transit marshrutka

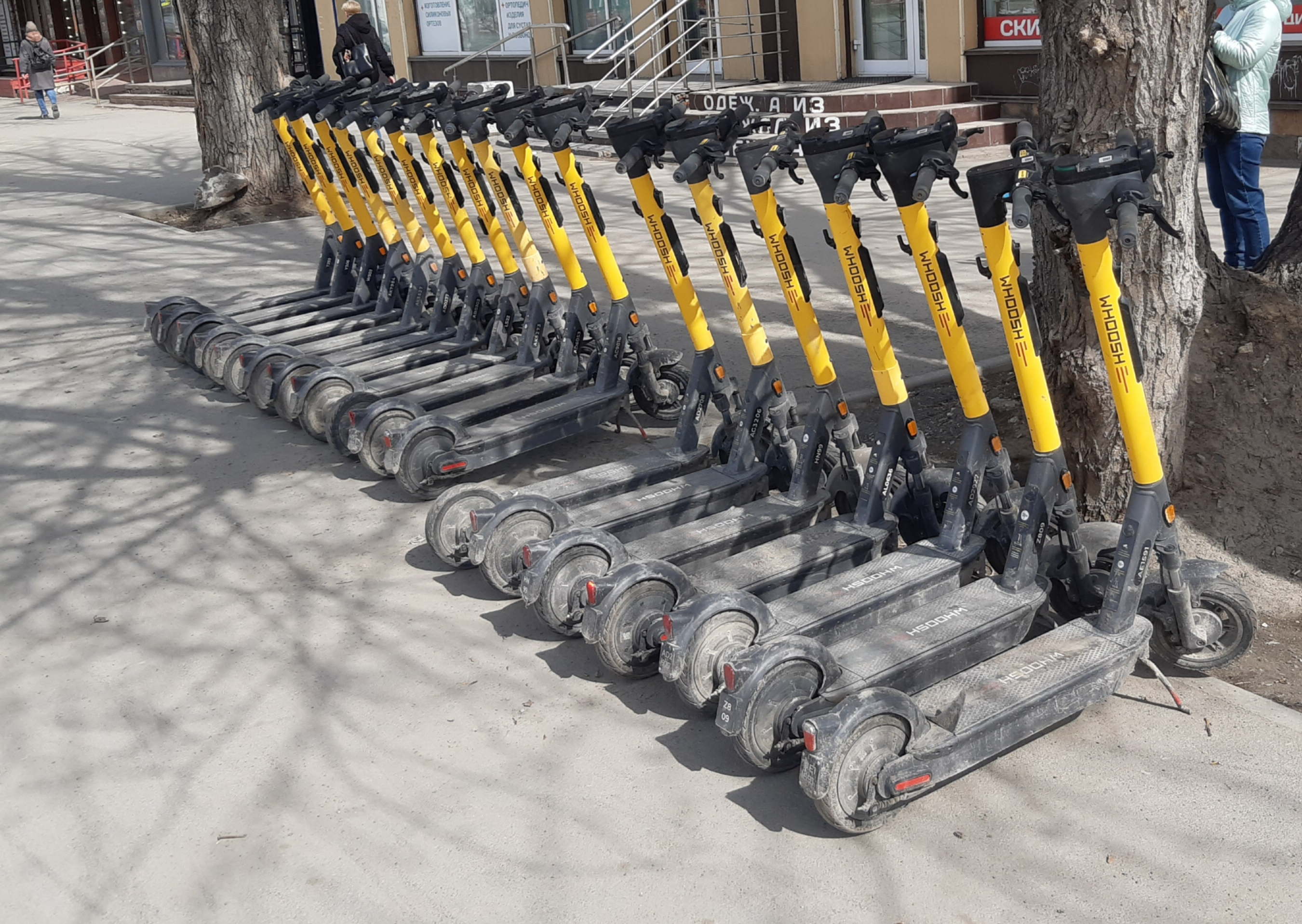

== Economy ==
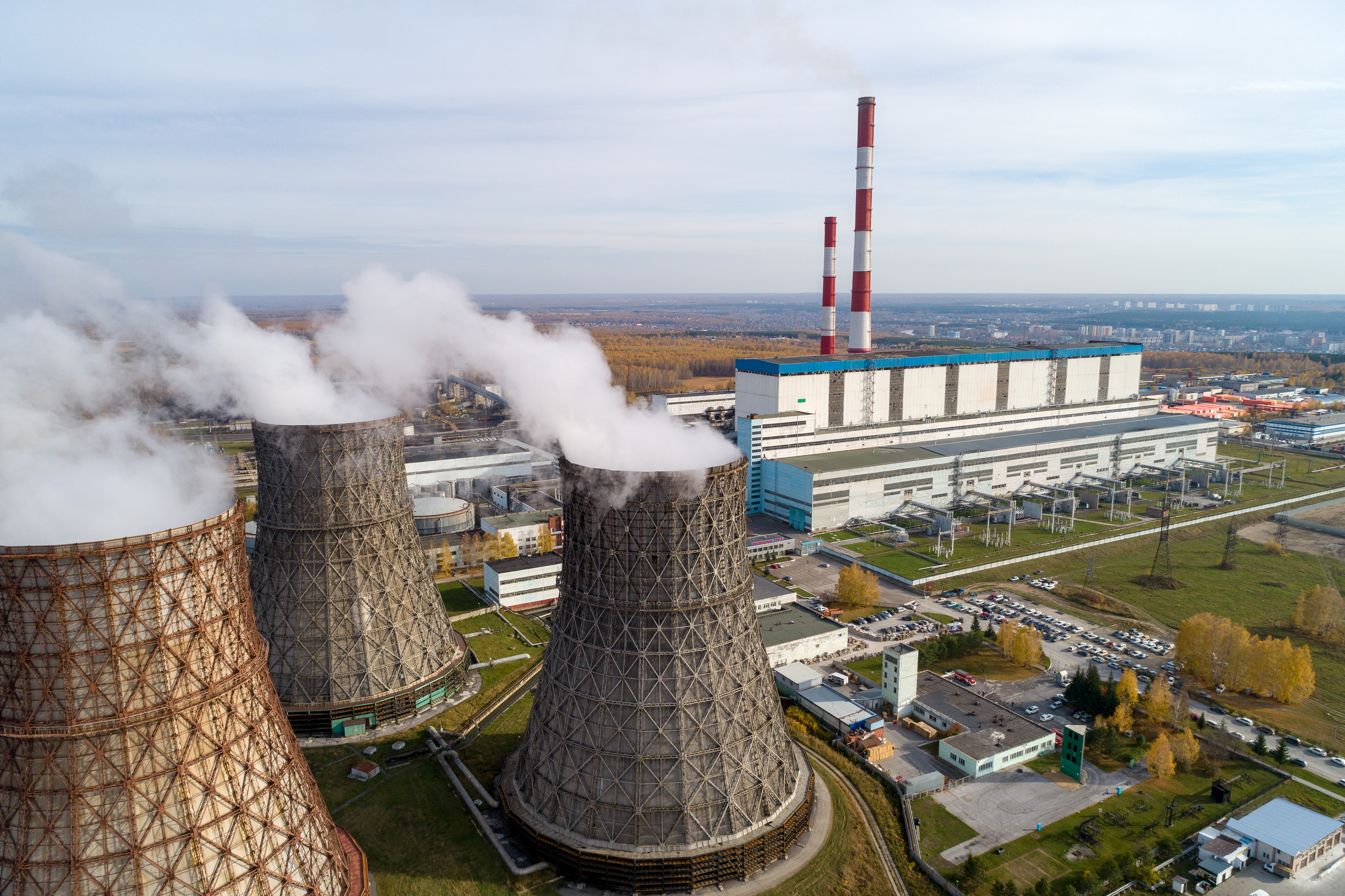
Novosibirsk CHP Station-5

Novosibirsk is a large industrial center. The industrial complex consists of 214 large and average-sized industrial enterprises. These produce more than two-thirds of all industrial output of the Novosibirsk region. Leading industries are aerospace (Chkalov's Novosibirsk Aircraft Plant), nuclear fuel (Novosibirsk Chemical Concentrates Plant), turbo and hydroelectric generators (NPO ELSIB), textile machinery (Textilmach), agriculture machinery (NPO "Sibselmash"), electronics components and devices production (Novosibirsk Factory and Design Bureau of Semiconductor Devices NZPP, OXID Novosibirsk Plant of Radio components), and metallurgy and metalworking (Kuzmina's Novosibirsk Metallurgical Plant, Novosibirsk Tin Plant OJSC, and JSC Plant of Rare Metals).

According to the television station RBC, Novosibirsk took third place in 2008 in the list of Russian cities most attractive to businesses (in 2007 it was placed thirteenth).

The Rich Family multi-national retailer was founded in Novosibirsk in 2002 and continues to maintain their headquarters in the city. Before the relocation of its headquarters to Ob, S7 Airlines had its head office in Novosibirsk.

The headquarters of a number of large Russian companies are located in Novosibirsk:

- RATM Holding
- Novosibirsk Aircraft Production Association Plant (NAPO) (a subsidiary of Sukhoi)
- Belon
- Center of Financial Technologies
- Siberian Coast Food Company (until 2009)
- NETA IT Company (retail, system integrator, software sales)
- Parallels IT Company (software for virtualization)
- Inmarko Food Company
- Siberian Food Corporation
- Electro-vacuum plant (the largest glass bottle factory in the Asian part of the country)
- NPO NIIIP-NZiK
- 2GIS

== Governance ==
Until 2023, the head of the city (mayor) was elected by universal suffrage among city residents. This position was held by Anatoly Lokot (Communist Party of the Russian Federation) from 23 April 2014. In February 2023, deputies of the Legislative Assembly of the Novosibirsk Oblast, in two readings, adopted a bill to abolish direct elections of the heads of Novosibirsk and the scientific settlement of Koltsovo; the election of heads of municipal administrations will take place on a competitive basis. On 28 December 2023, the governor of Novosibirsk Oblast, Andrey Travnikov, announced that Anatoly Lokot was going on vacation with subsequent dismissal. First Deputy Mayor Oleg Klemeshov was appointed acting mayor. On 16 April 2024, based on the results of voting by deputies of the Novosibirsk City Council of Deputies, Deputy Governor of the Novosibirsk Region Maxim Kudryavtsev (United Russia) was elected mayor of Novosibirsk.

== Sport ==
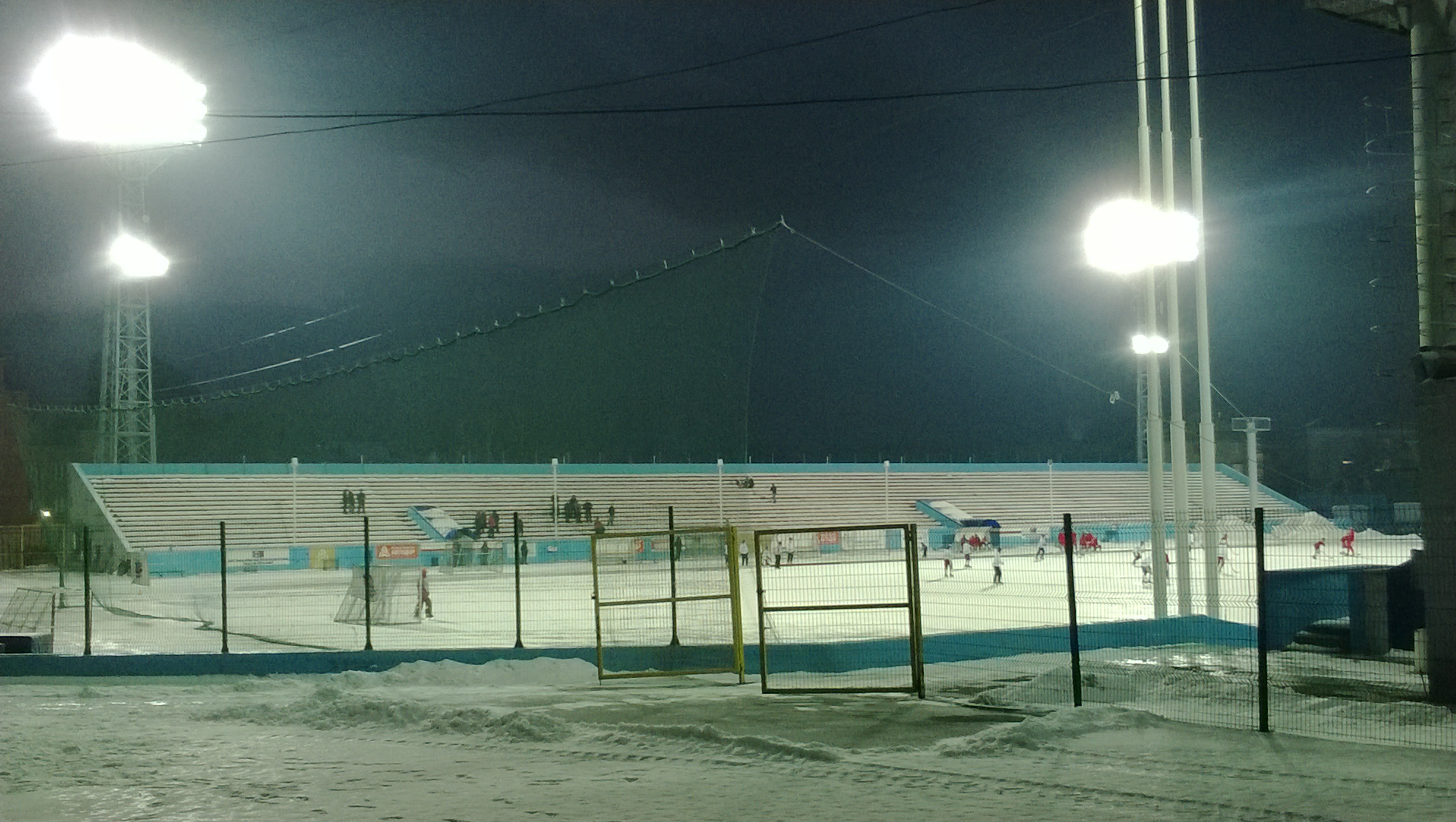
Bandy at Sibselmash Stadium

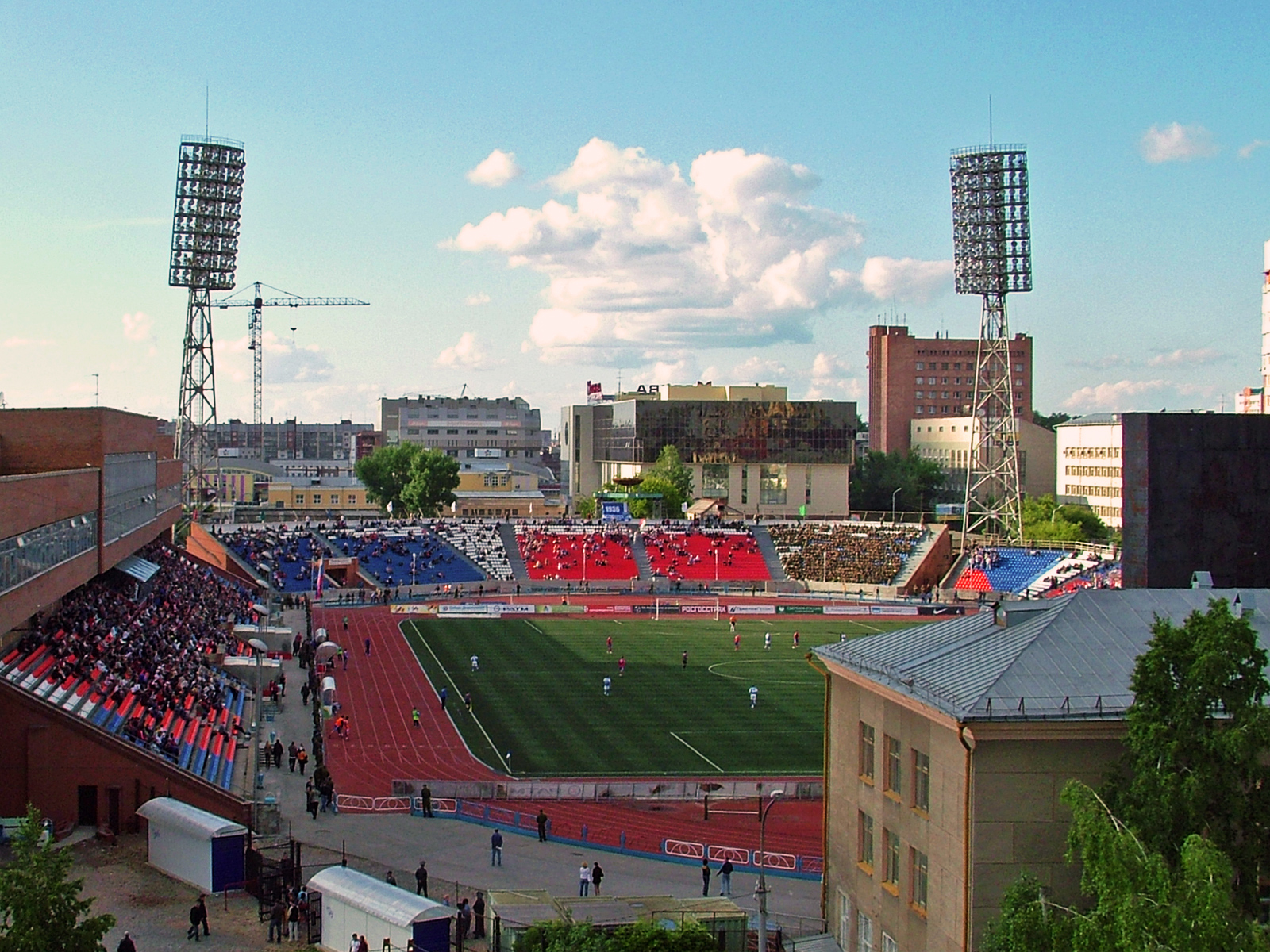
Spartak Stadium and city surroundings

Professional sports clubs active in the city:

| Club | Sport | Founded | Current league | League rank | Stadium |
|---|---|---|---|---|---|
| FC Novosibirsk | Football | 1936 | Russian Professional Football League | 3rd | Spartak Stadium |
| Sibir Novosibirsk | Ice hockey | 1962 | Kontinental Hockey League | 1st | Ice Sports Palace Sibir |
| Sibselmash Novosibirsk | Bandy | 1937 | Russian Bandy Super League | 1st | Sibselmash Stadium |
| BC Novosibirsk | Basketball | 2011 | Basketball Super League | 2nd | SKK Sever |
| Dynamo-GUVD Novosibirsk | Basketball | 1955 | Women's Basketball Premier League | 1st | SKK Sever |
| Lokomotiv Novosibirsk | Volleyball | 1977 | Volleyball Super League | 1st | Lokomotiv-Arena |
| Sibiryak Novosibirsk | Futsal | 1988 | Futsal Super League | 1st | NSAAA Sports Hall |

Novosibirsk is the home town of several former Olympians, including Aleksandr Karelin, a twelve-time world Greco-Roman wrestling champion who has been voted the greatest Greco-Roman wrestler of the twentieth century by the sport's international governing body of FILA.

The city also hosts a number of national and international Ice Speedway events. Siberia Novosibirsk competed in the Russian Ice Speedway Premier League in 2012/13, and 2013/2014. The speedway venue known as the Motordrome ROSTO is located on Ulitsa Tul'skaya, 205 at (54°58′07″N 82°53′30″E).

The Siberia Novosibirsk motorcycle speedway team regularly participated in the Soviet Union Championship from its inaugural edition in 1962 through to 1992 and then from 1993 to 1995 in the Russian Championship. The team were champions of the Soviet Union in 1980.

== Music ==
Several contemporary classical violinists, such as Vadim Repin, the late Alexander Skwortsow, Natalia Lomeiko, and Maxim Vengerov, are natives of Novosibirsk. Also born in the city were punk legend, poet and singer-songwriter Yanka Dyagileva, tragic punk rocker Dmitry Selivanov, folk/folk-rock singer Pelageya Khanova, and cellist Tatjana Vassiljeva. The career of poet and singer-songwriter Tatyana Snezhina was connected with Novosibirsk.

The city possesses the Novosibirsk State Conservatory, named in honor of the composer Mikhail Glinka; Novosibirsk State Philharmony, home to Novosibirsk Academic Symphony Orchestra, Novosibirsk Philharmonic Chamber Orchestra, Russian Academic Orchestra of Folk Instruments, and other musical groups; Novosibirsk Opera and Ballet Theater; and several notable music venues.

== Education ==
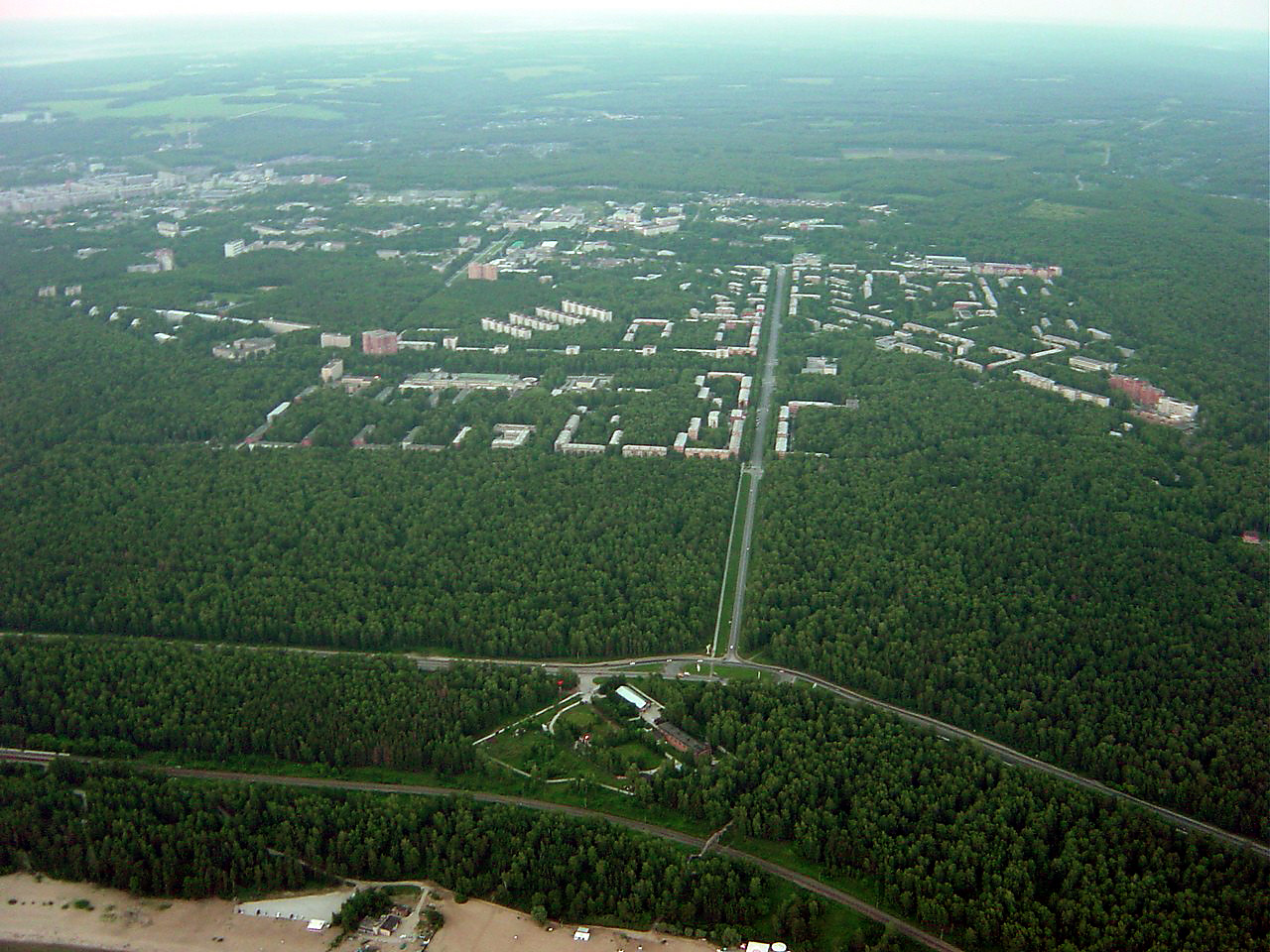
Airphoto of Akademgorodok

Novosibirsk is home to the following institutions of higher education:

- Novosibirsk State University (1959)
- Novosibirsk State Technical University (1950)
- Novosibirsk State University of Economics and Management (1929)
- Novosibirsk State Agricultural University (1936)
- Novosibirsk State University of Architecture, Design and Arts (1989)
- Novosibirsk State University of Architecture and Civil Engineering (1930)
- Novosibirsk State Medical University (1935)
- Novosibirsk State Pedagogical University (1935)
- Novosibirsk State Theater Institute (1960)
- Novosibirsk State Conservatory named after M.I. Glinka (1956)
- Novosibirsk Higher Military Command School of the Ministry of Defence of the Russian Federation (1967)
- Novosibirsk Military Institute named after I.K. Yakovlev of the National Guard Forces Command of the Russian Federation (1971)
- Novosibirsk Institute of the Federal Security Service of the Russian Federation (1935)
- Siberian State Transport University (1932)
- Siberian State University of Water Transport (1951)
- Siberian State University of Geosystems and Technologies (1933)
- Siberian State University of Telecommunications and Informatics (1953)
- Siberian Institute of Management of the Russian Presidential Academy of National Economy and Public Administration (1991)
- Siberian Institute of International Relations and Regional Studies (1998)
- Siberian University of Consumer Cooperation (1956)
- Siberian Academy of Finance and Banking (1992)

Additionally, there are more than 50 vocational schools in Novosibirsk.

Akademgorodok is a remote part of Novosibirsk dedicated to science. It houses the Siberian branch of the Russian Academy of Sciences and is the location of Novosibirsk State University and Novosibirsk Higher Military Command School. All other higher education institutions are located in the central part of the city of Novosibirsk on both banks of the Ob river.

The Quality Schools International QSI International School of Novosibirsk, previously located in Akademgorodok, opened in 2008.

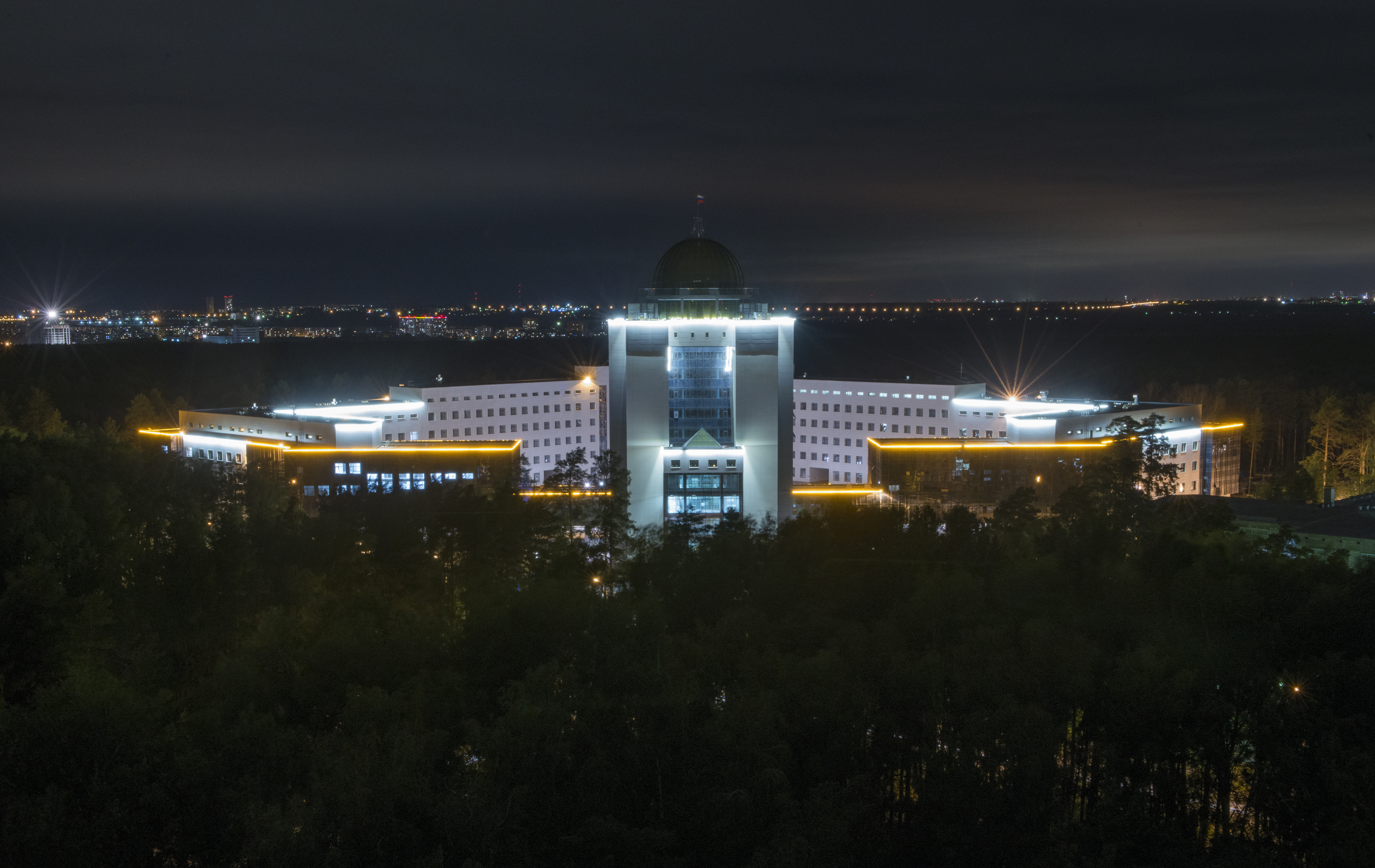
Novosibirsk State University

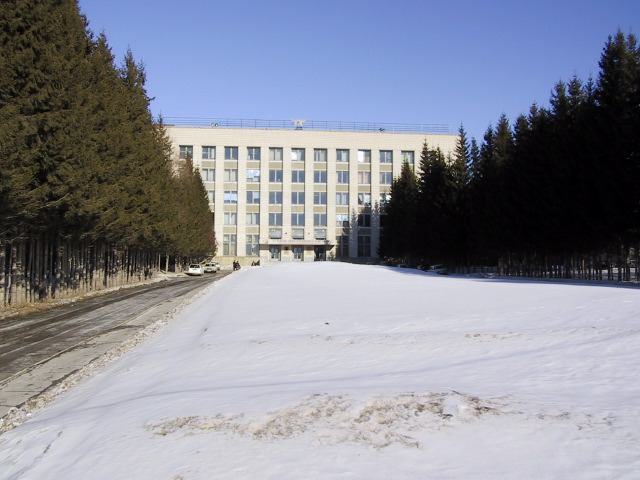
Budker Institute of Nuclear Physics

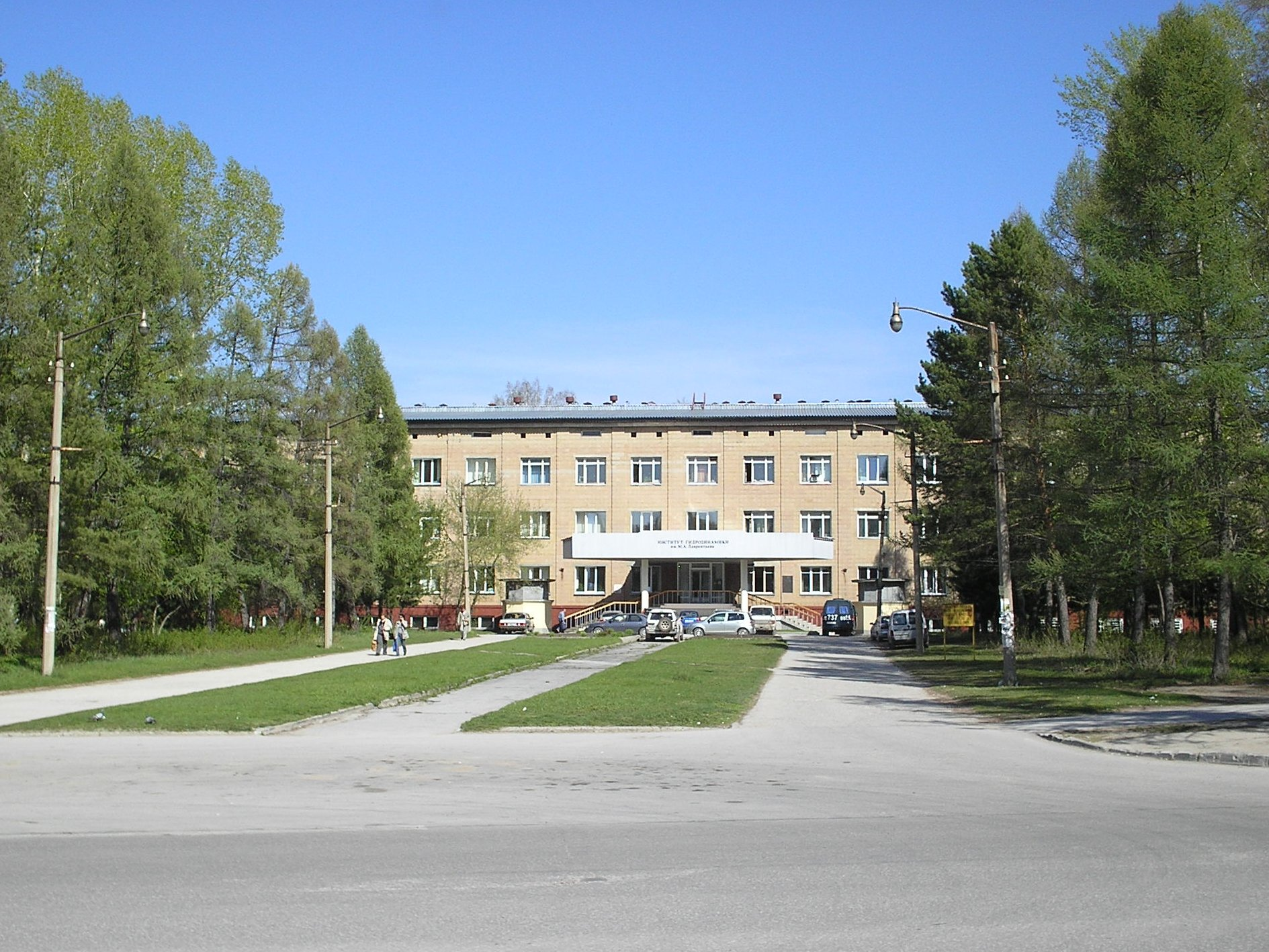
Lavrentyev Institute of Hydrodynamics

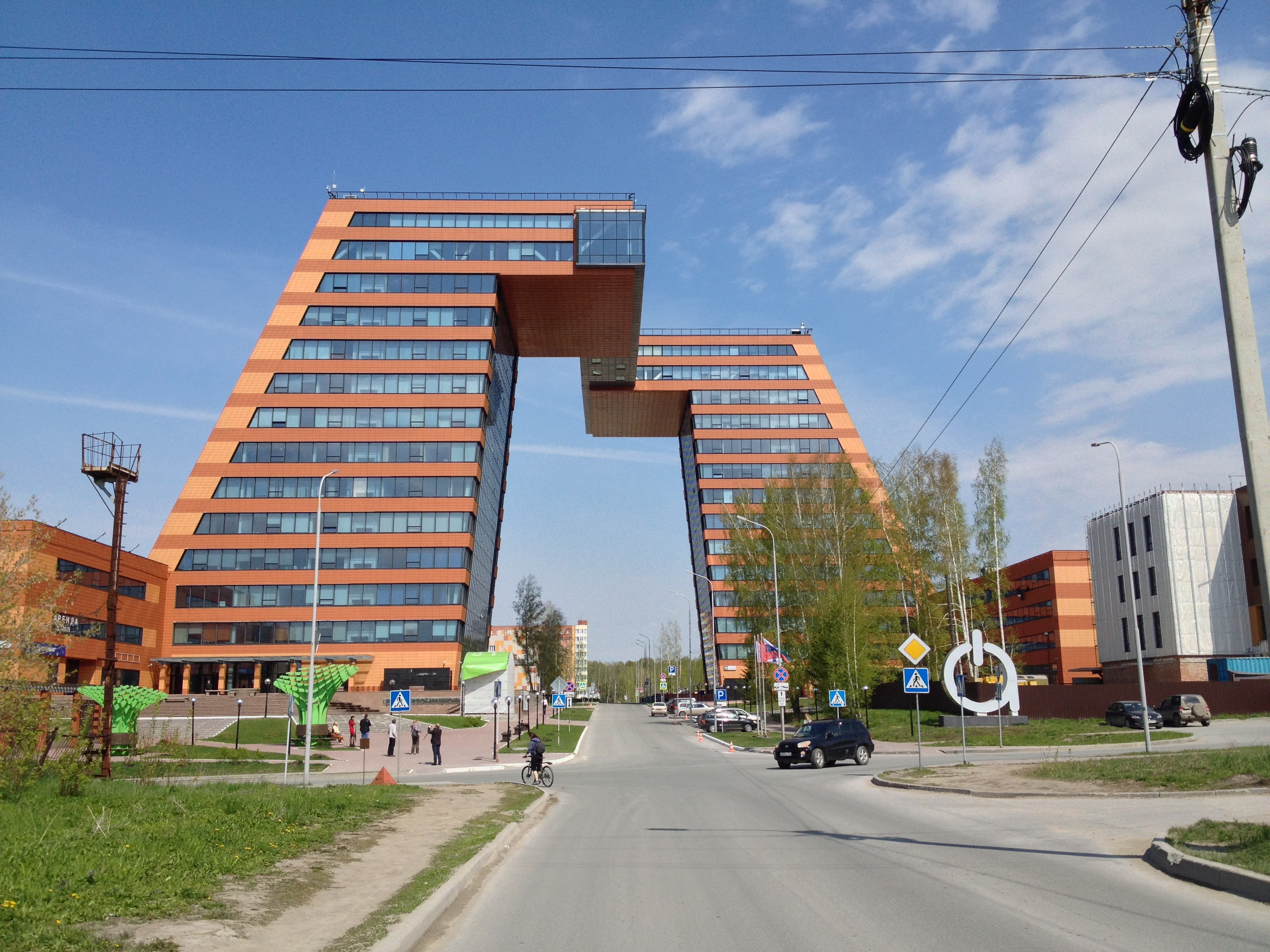
Technopark of the Novosibirsk Akademgorodok

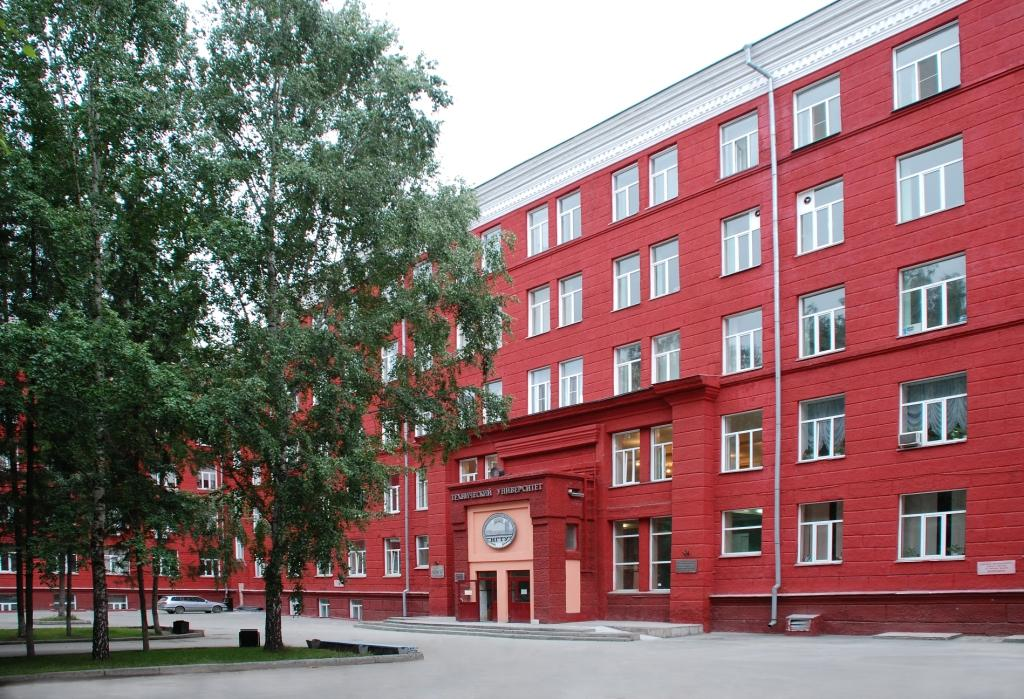
Novosibirsk State Technical University

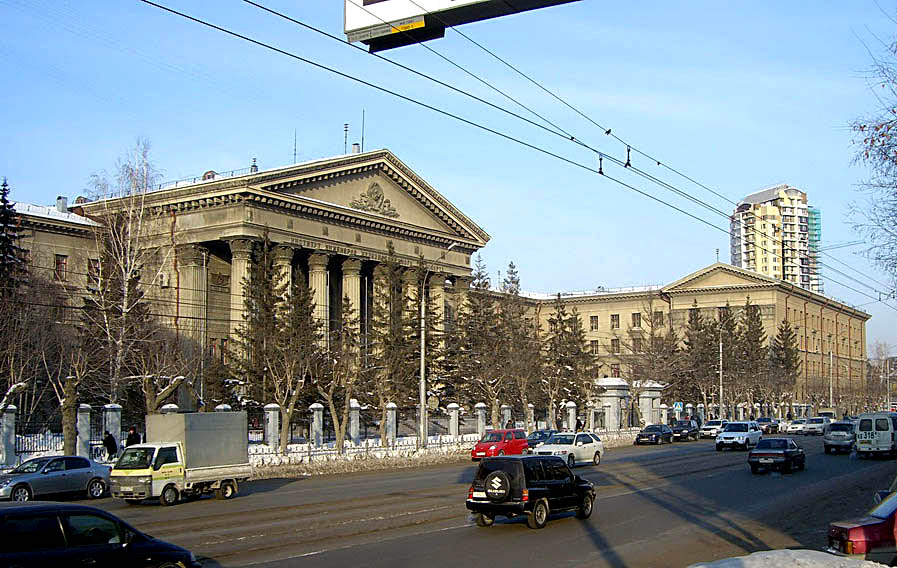
Siberian State Transport University

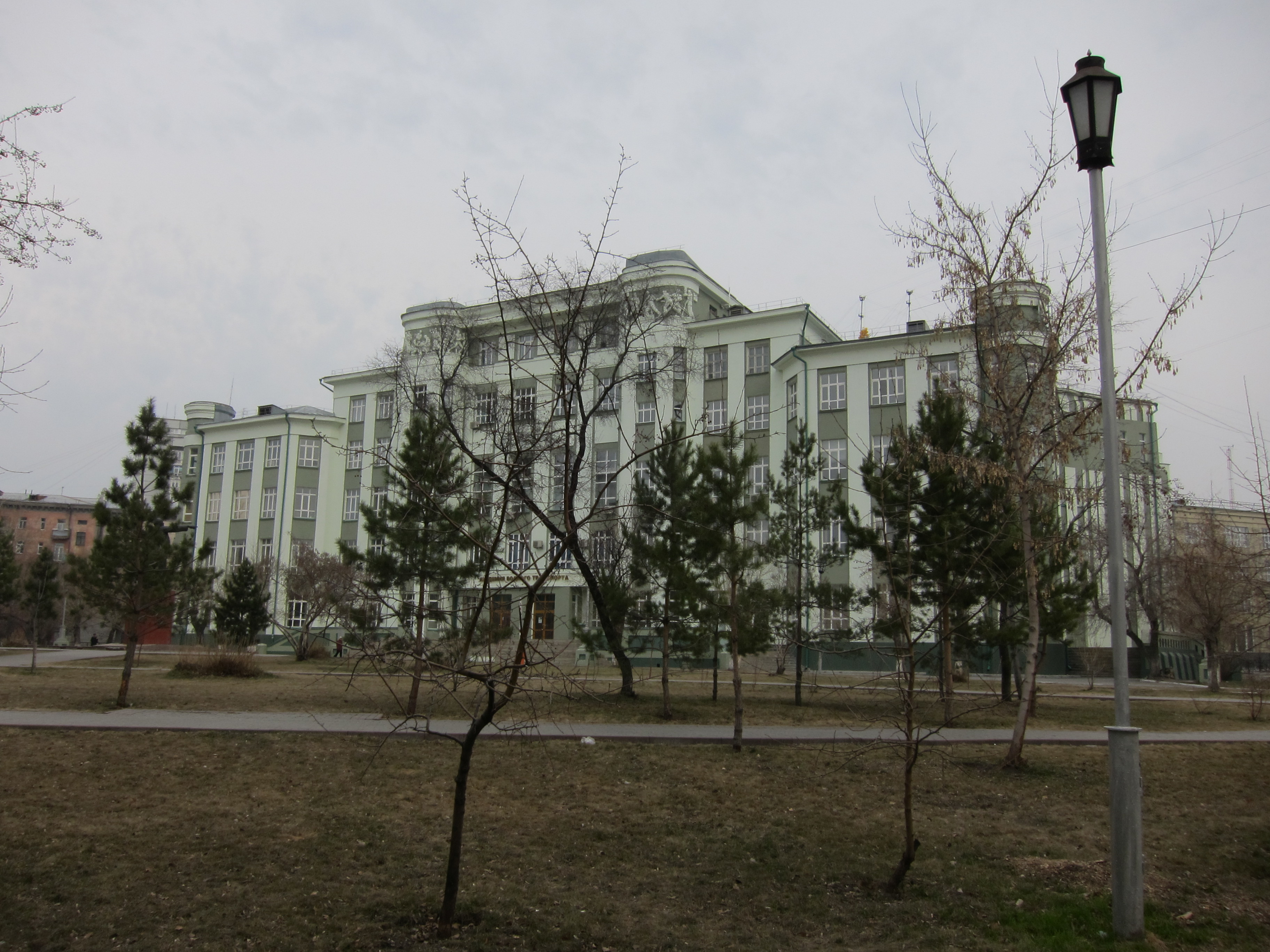
Siberian State University of Water Transport

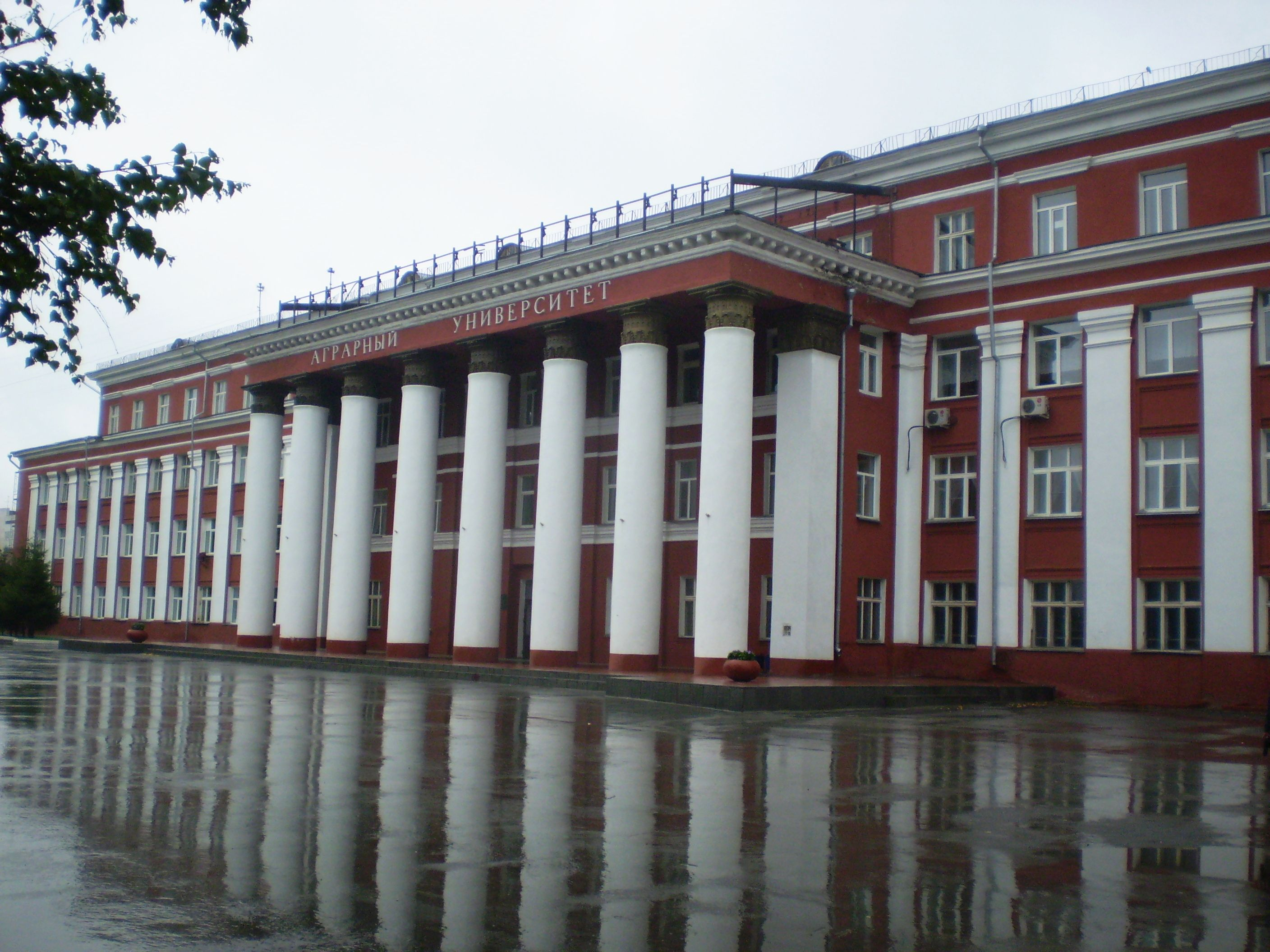
Novosibirsk State Agricultural University

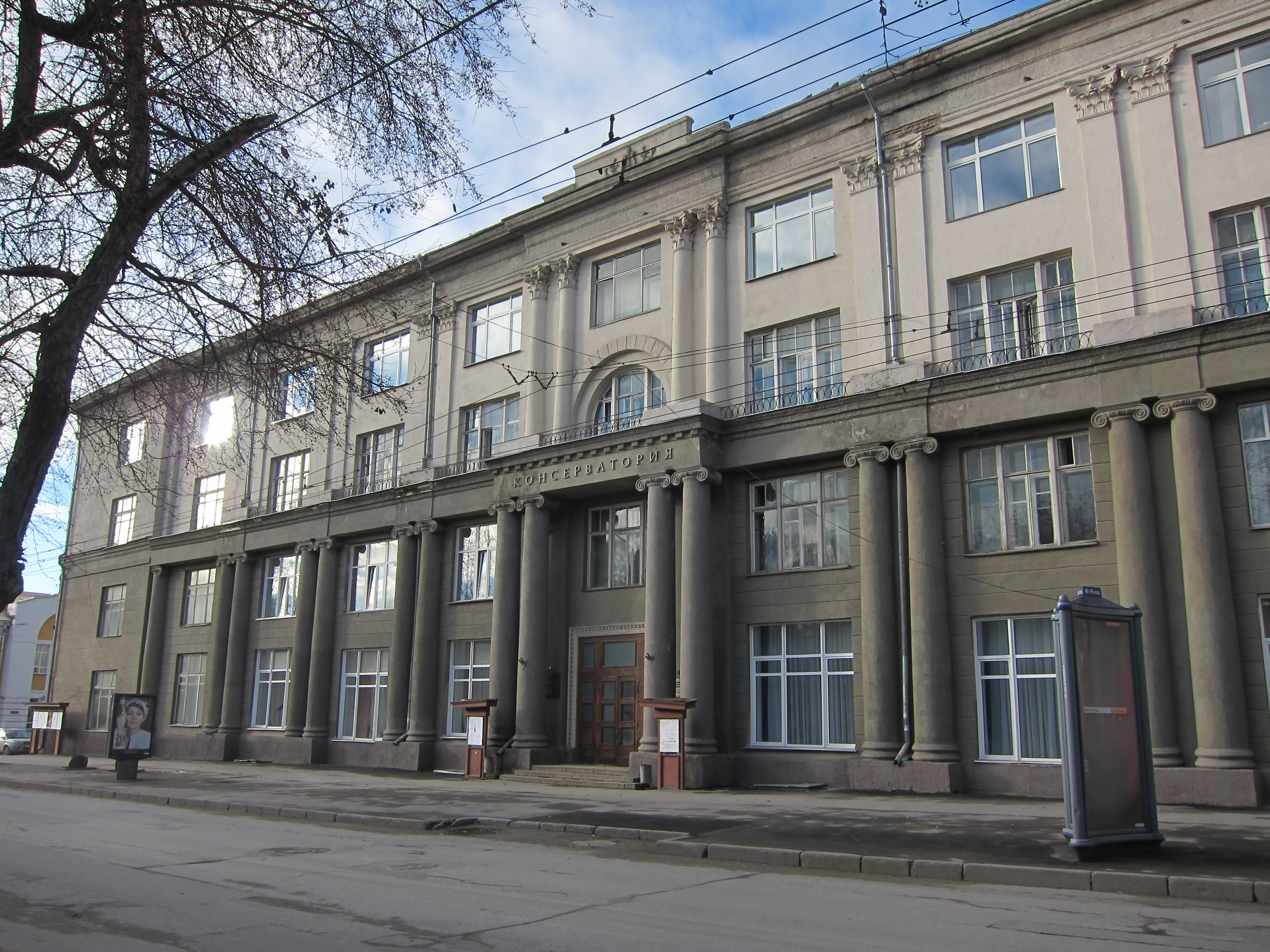
Novosibirsk State Conservatory named after M.I. Glinka

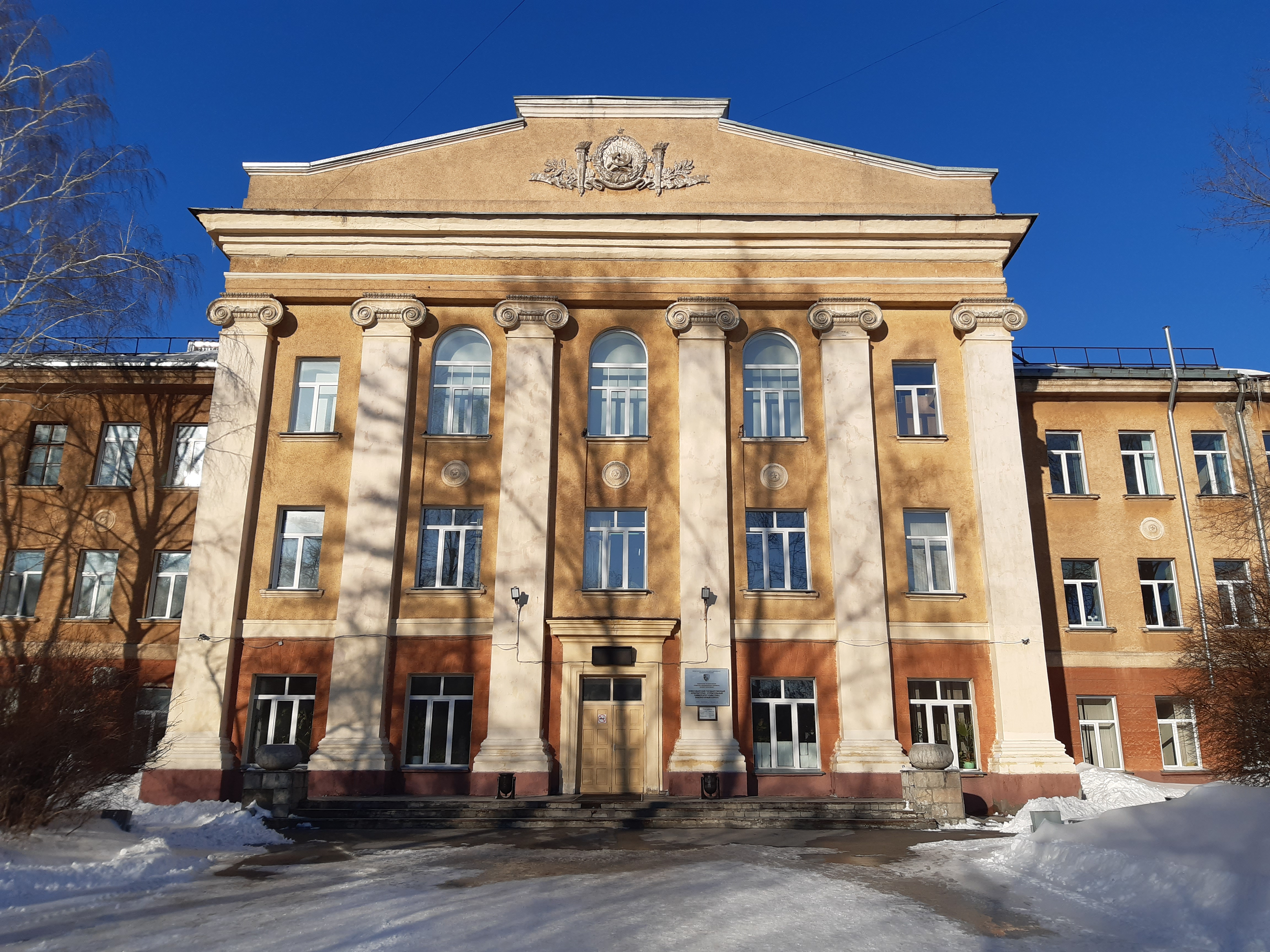
Novosibirsk State University of Architecture and Civil Engineering

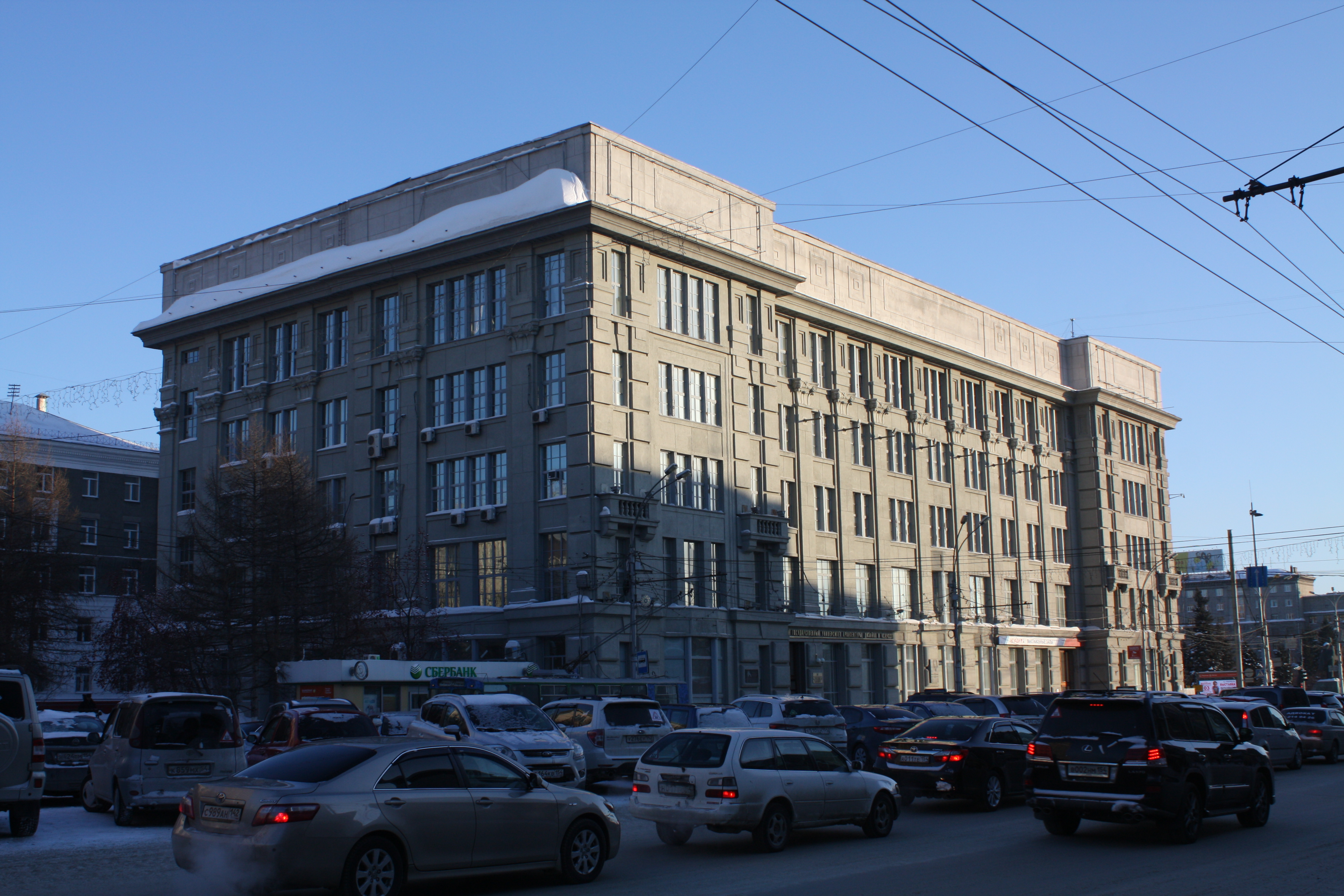
Novosibirsk State University of Architecture, Design and Arts

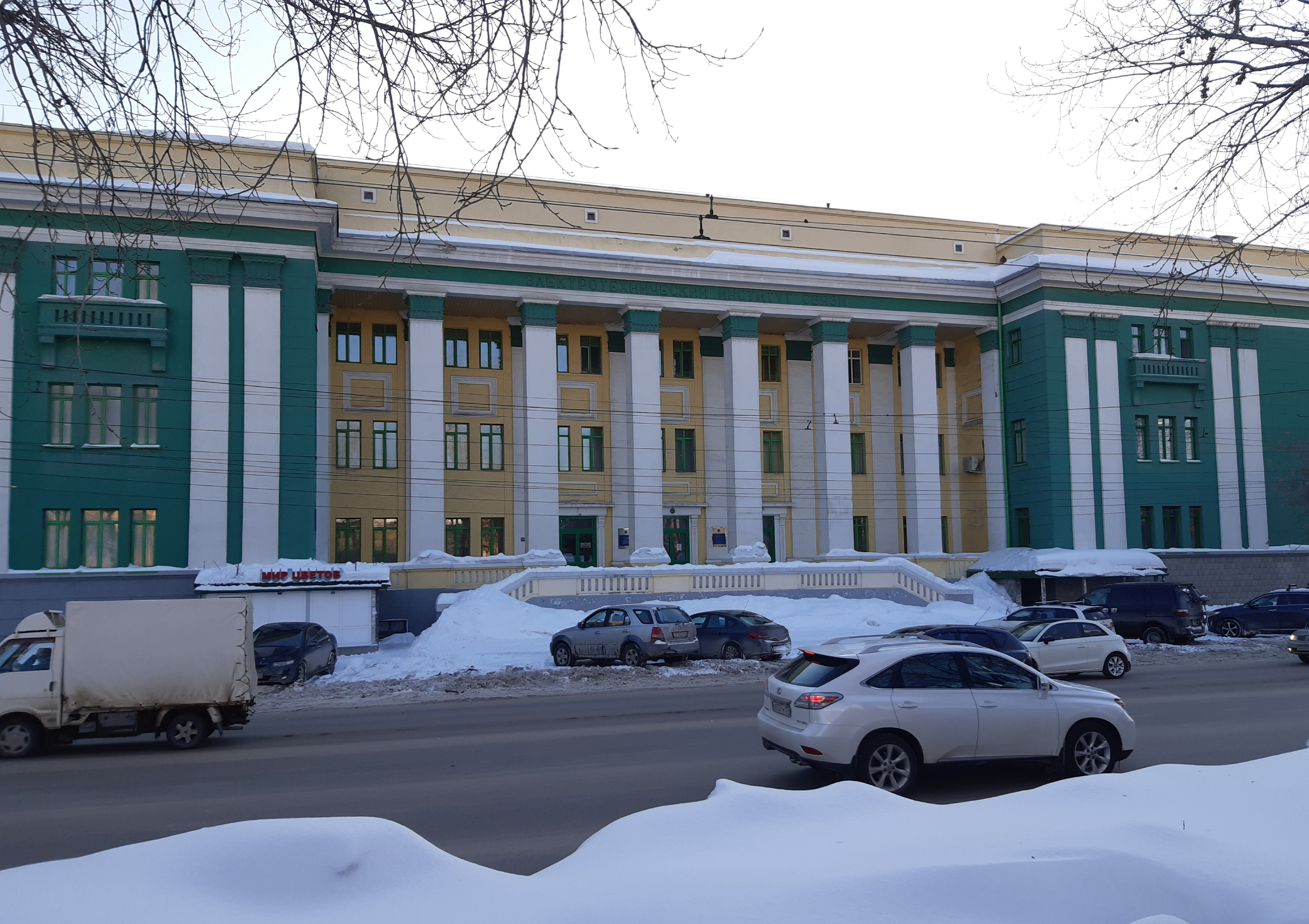
Siberian State University of Telecommunications and Informatics

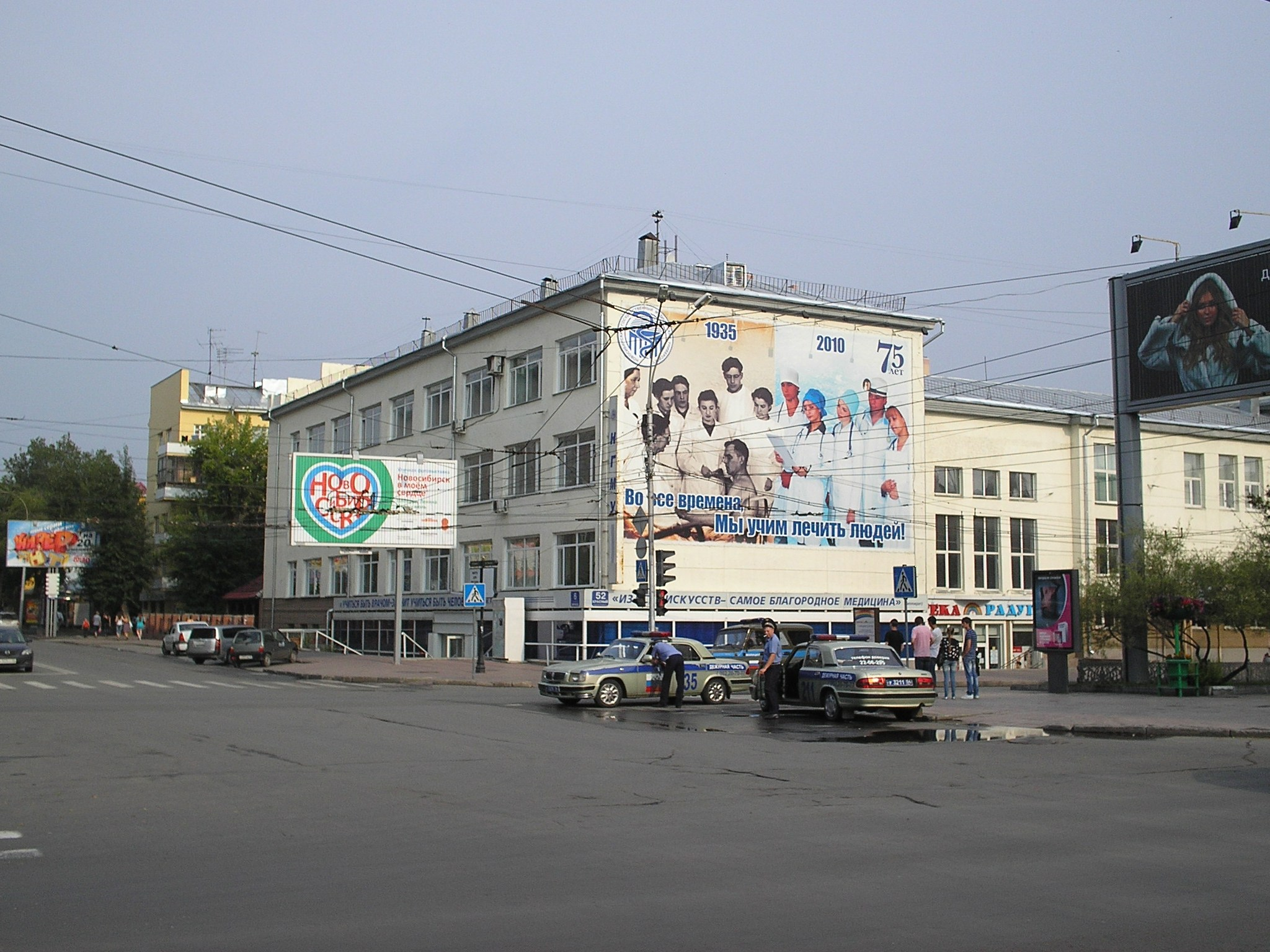
Novosibirsk State Medical University

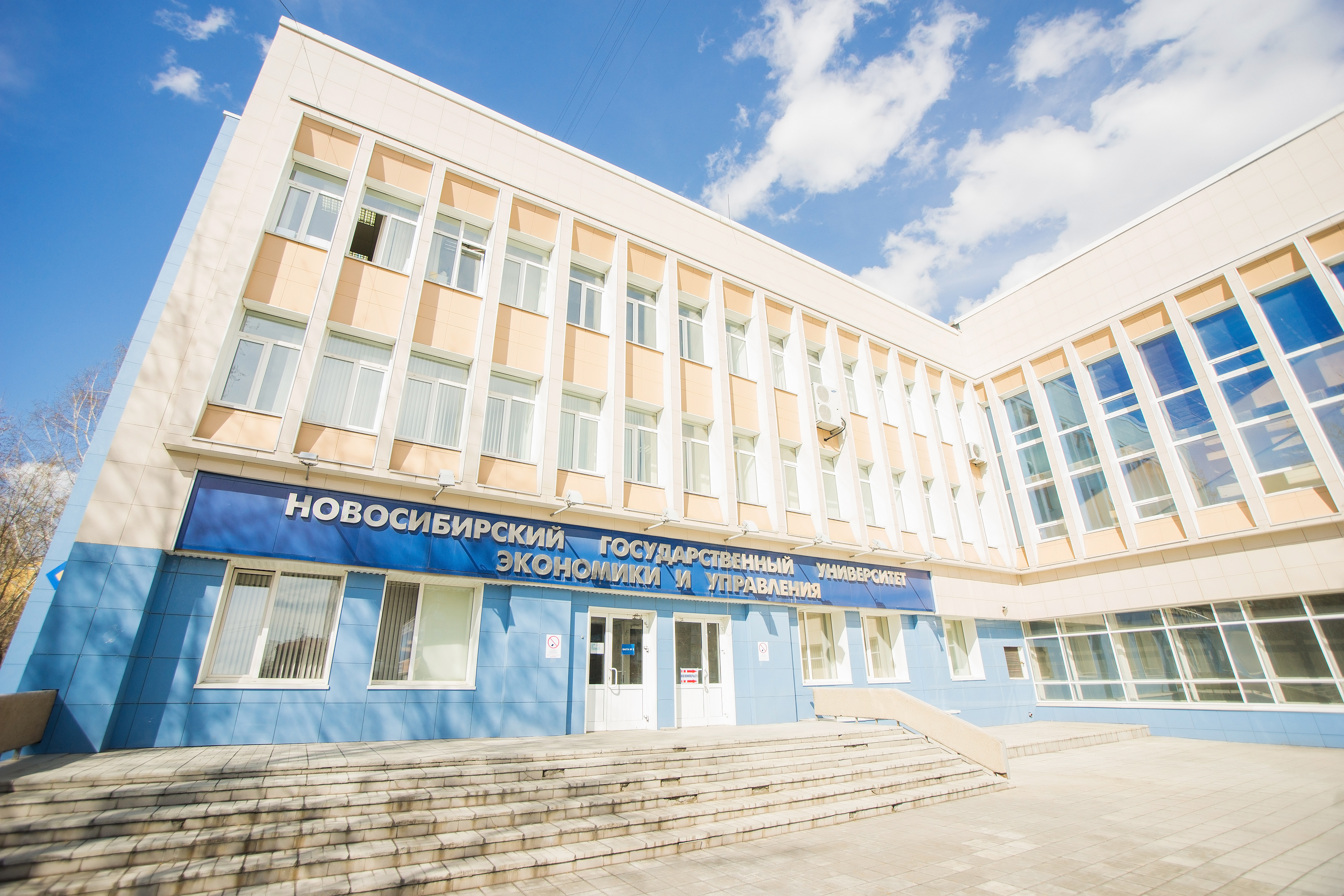
Novosibirsk State University of Economics and Management

== Culture ==
=== Libraries ===
There are many libraries in Novosibirsk. The most significant libraries are the following:

- State Public Scientific & Technological Library
- Novosibirsk State Regional Scientific Library
- Novosibirsk Regional Special Library for the blind and visually impaired
- Novosibirsk Regional Youth Library
- Novosibirsk Regional Children's Library
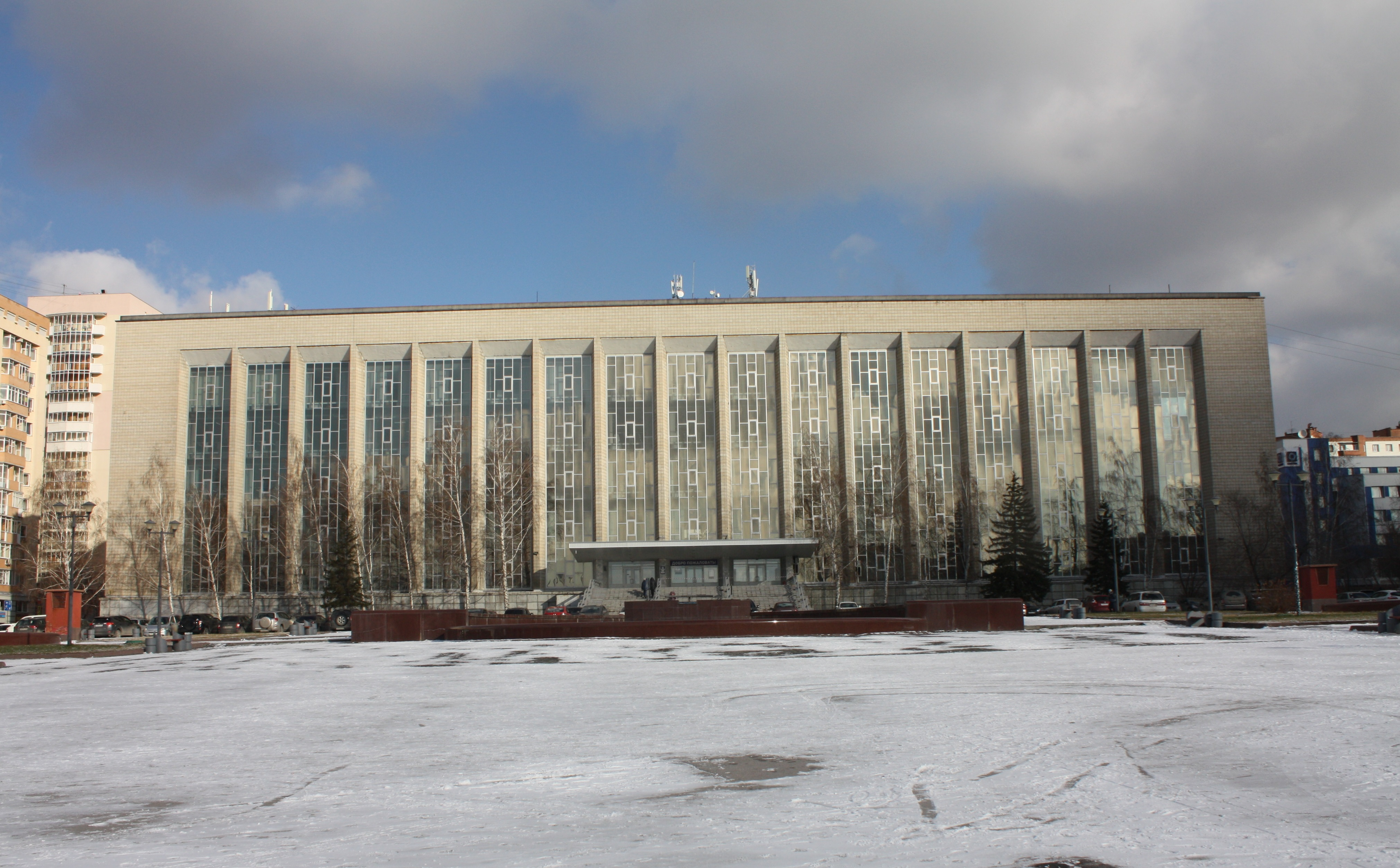
State Public Scientific & Technological Library

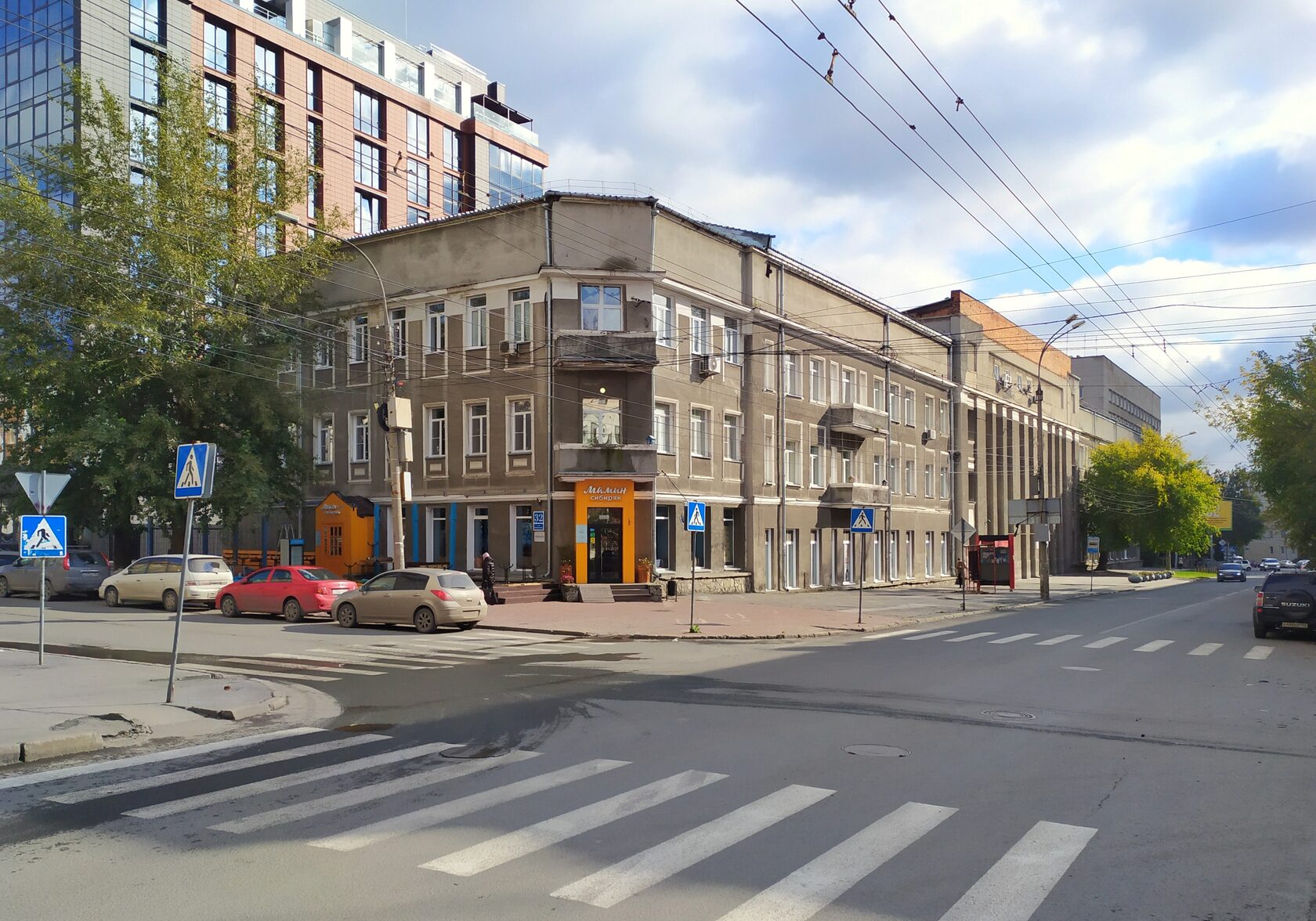
Novosibirsk State Regional Scientific Library

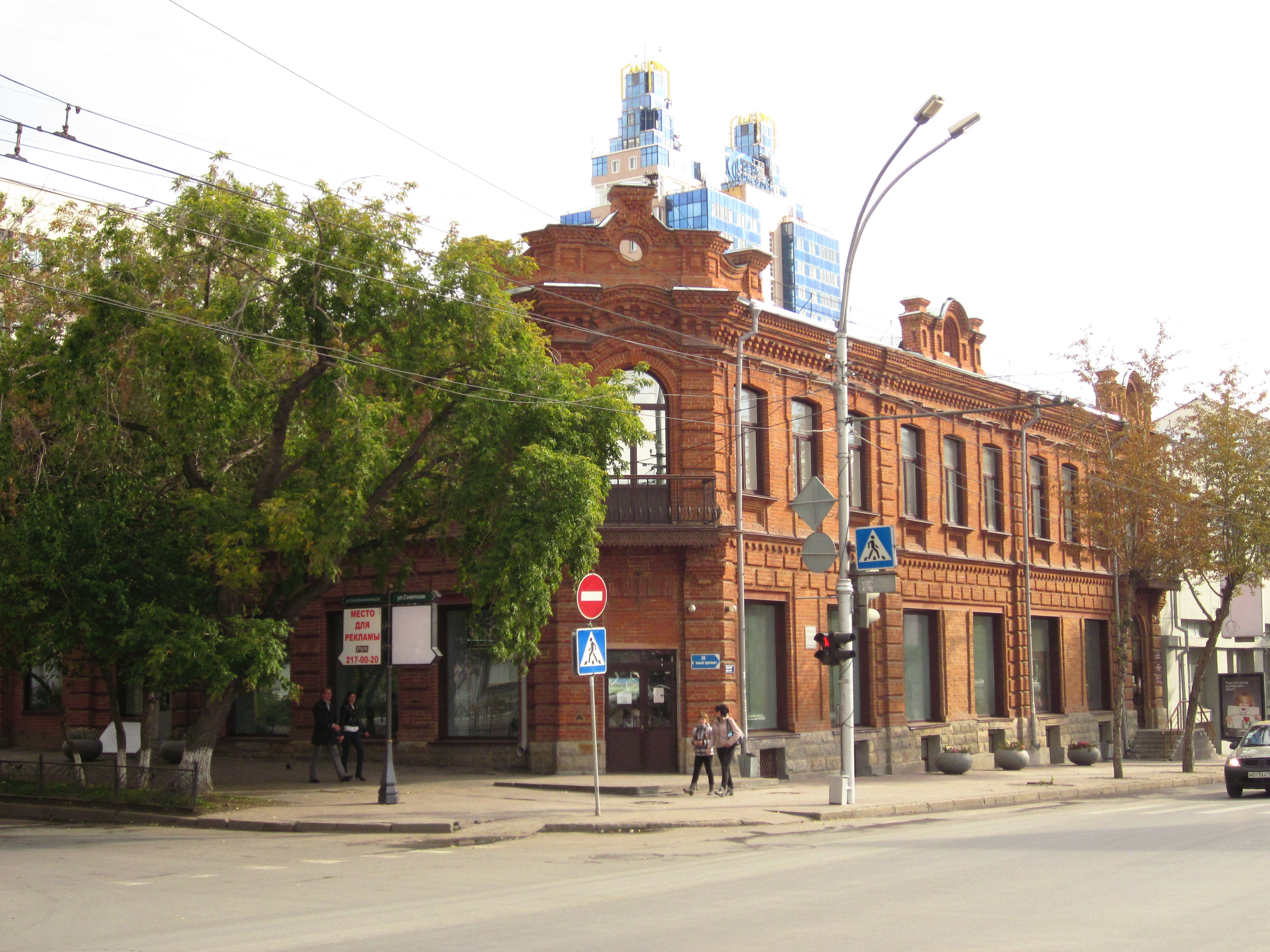
Novosibirsk Regional Youth Library

=== Theatres ===
- Novosibirsk Opera and Ballet Theatre (1945)
- Novosibirsk Regional Puppet Theatre (1933)
- Novosibirsk State Drama Theatre "Old House" (1933)
- Novosibirsk State Academic Drama Theatre "Red Torch" (1932), directed by Timofey Kulyabin since 2015
- Novosibirsk Academic Youth Theatre "Globe" (1930)
- Novosibirsk Musical Theatre (1959)
- Novosibirsk City Theatre under the direction of Sergey Afanasiev (1988)
- Novosibirsk Drama Theatre "On the left bank" (1997)
- Novosibirsk Studio Theatre "First Theatre" (2009)
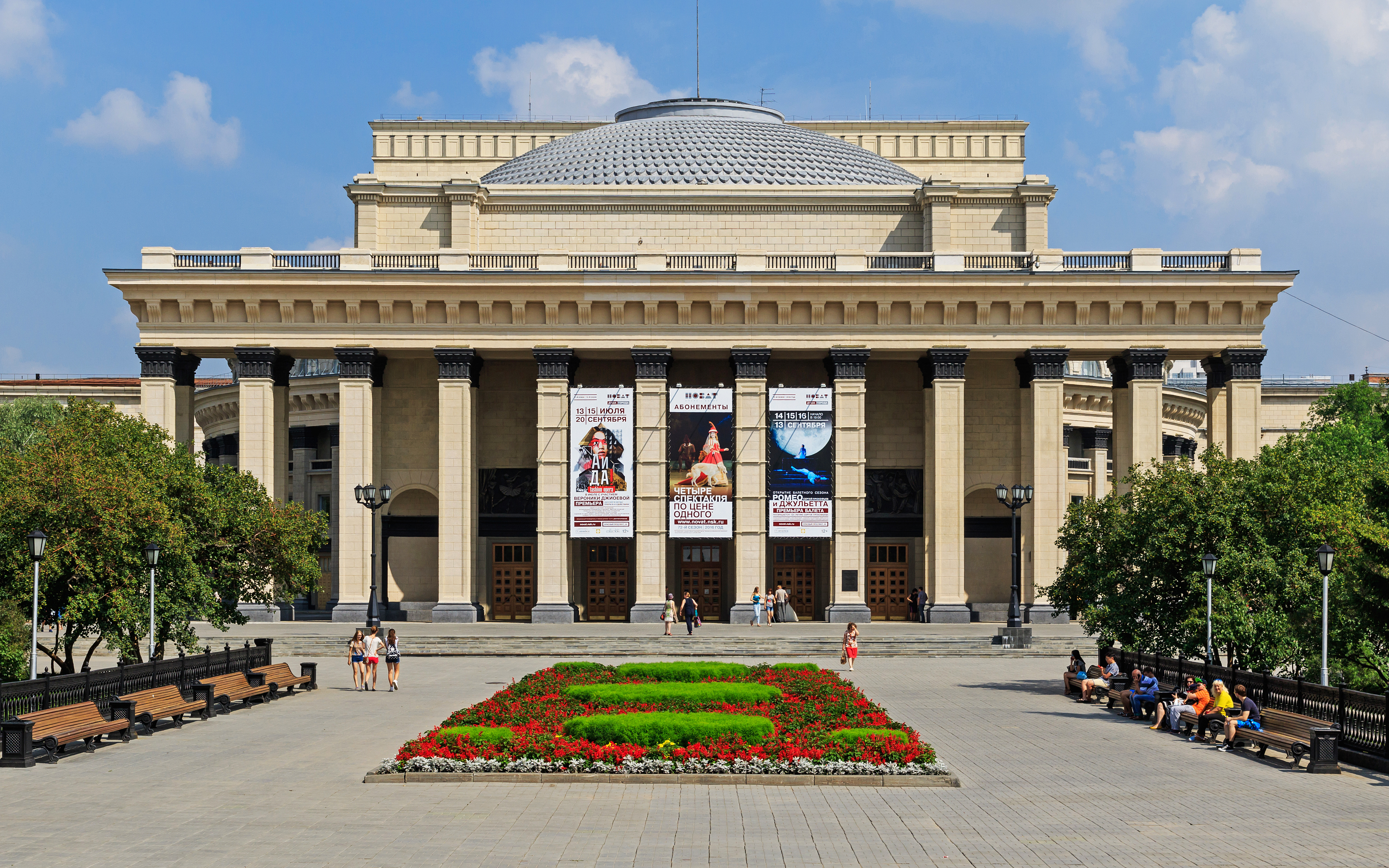
Novosibirsk Opera and Ballet Theatre

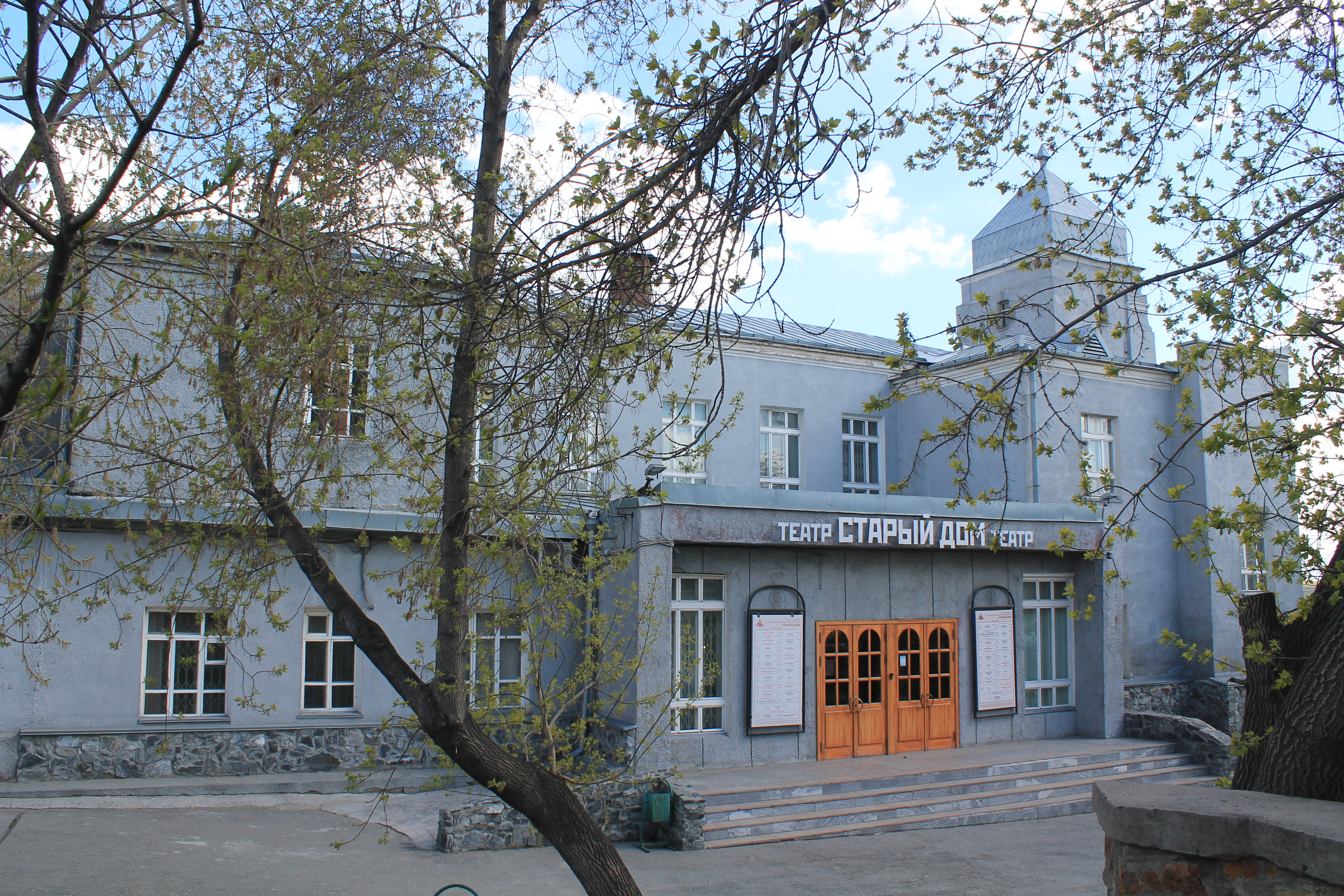
Novosibirsk State Drama Theatre "Old House"

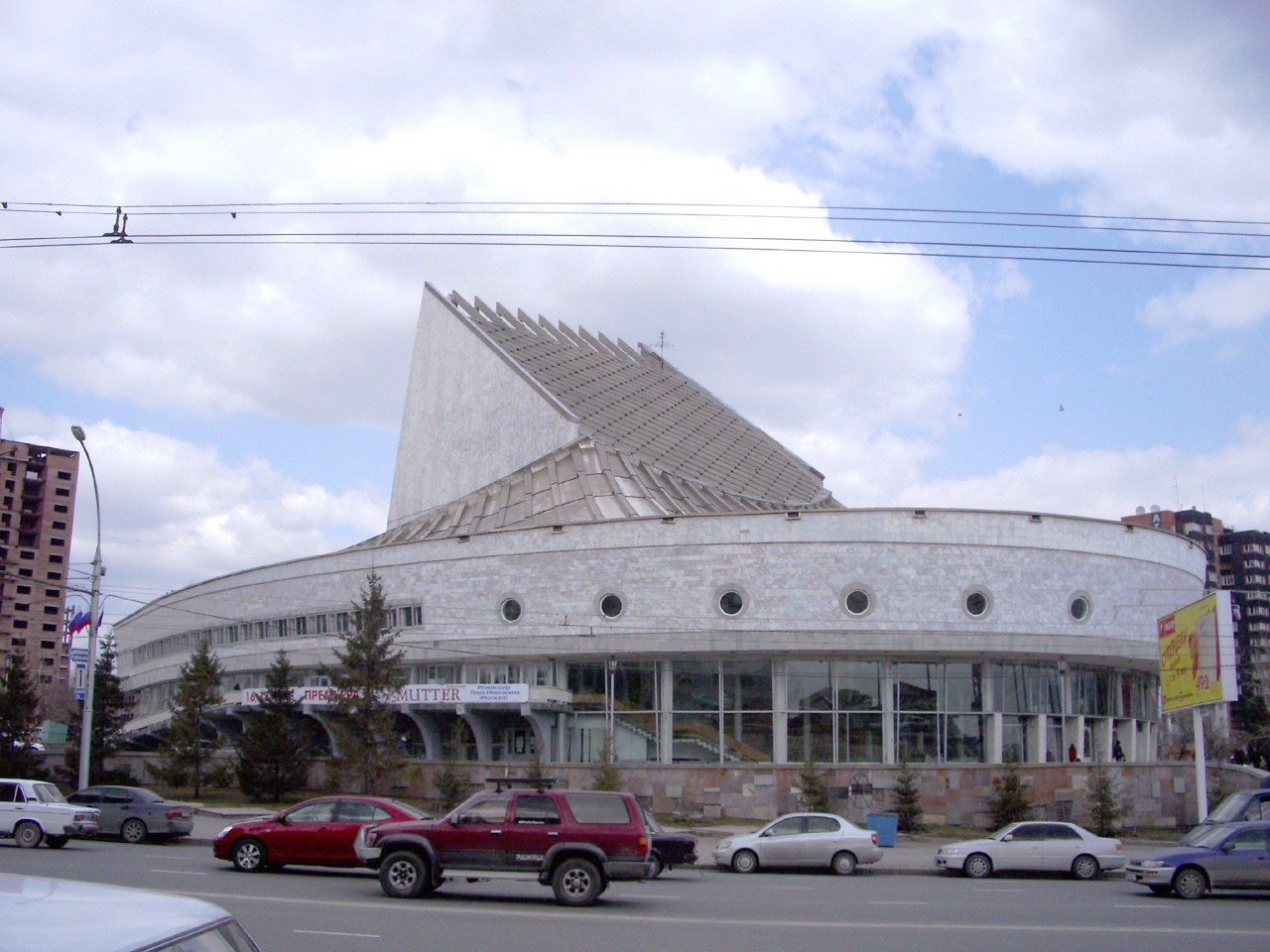
Novosibirsk Academic Youth Theatre "Globe"

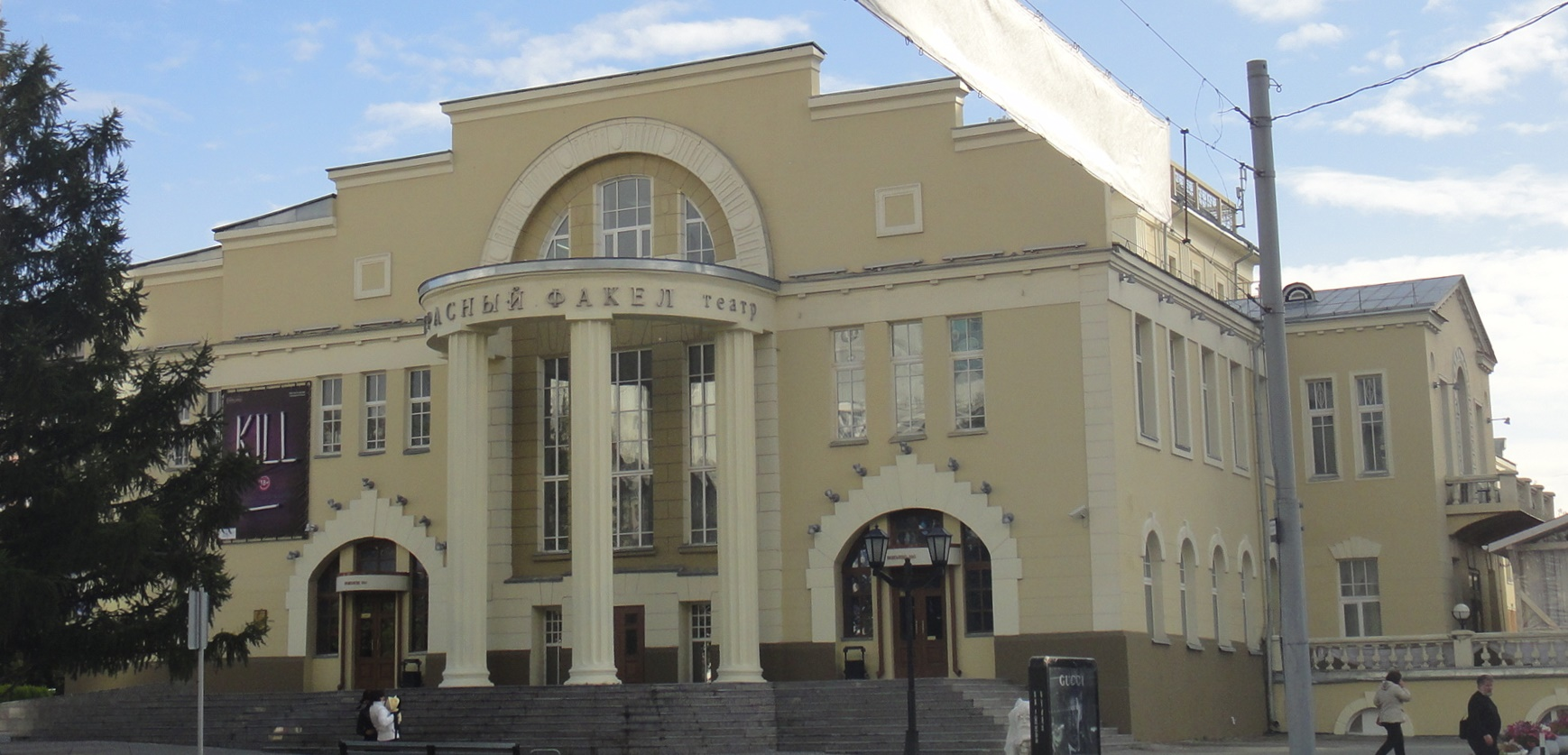
Novosibirsk State Academic Drama Theatre "Red Torch"

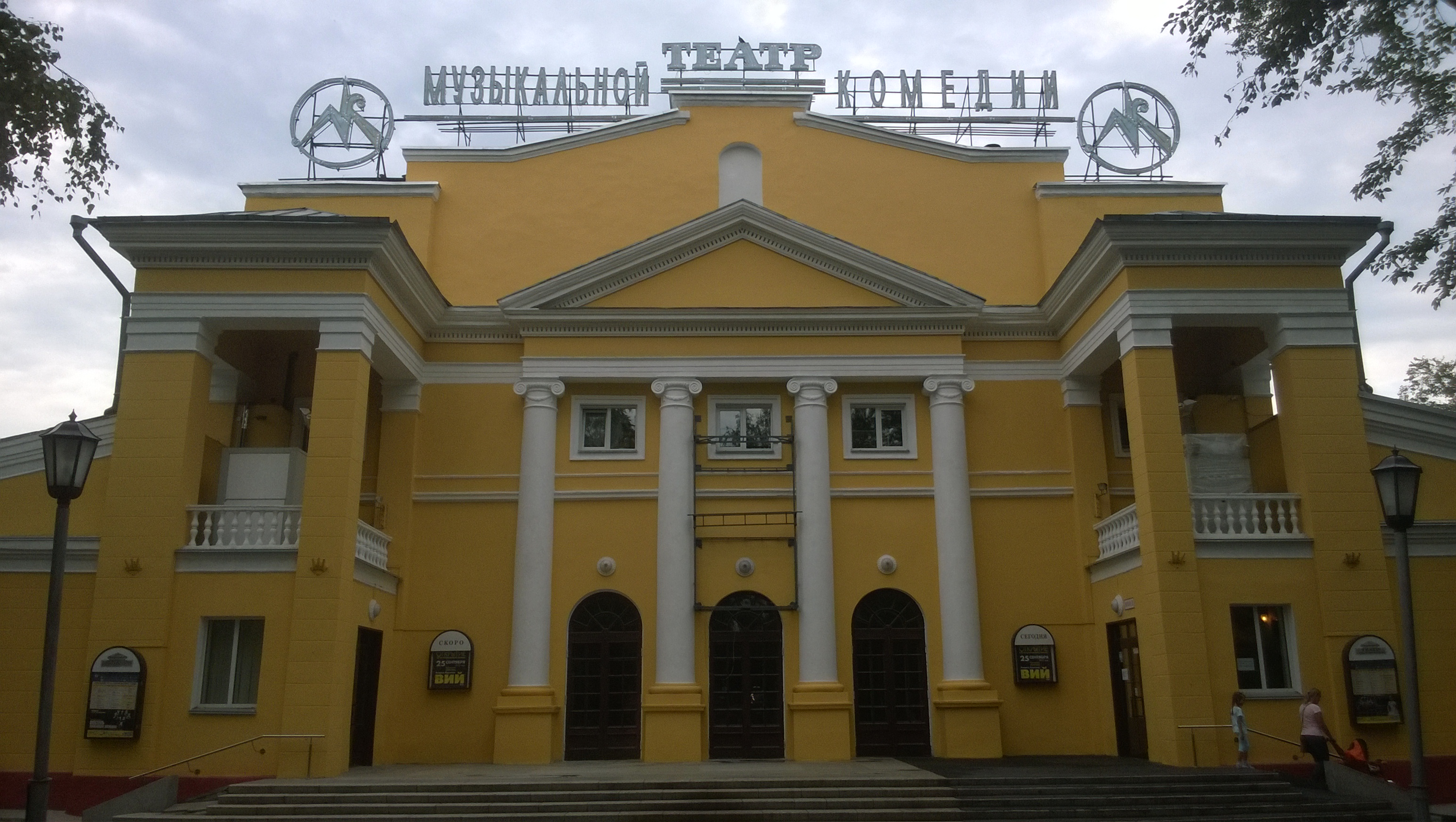
Novosibirsk Musical Theatre

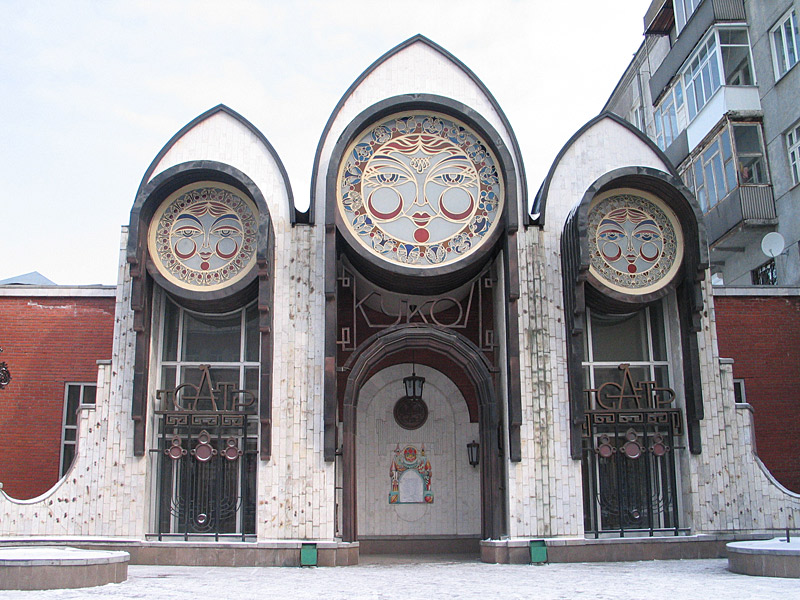
Novosibirsk Regional Puppet Theatre

=== Philharmonic ===
Novosibirsk State Philharmonic Society was founded in 1937. It holds about 60 concerts per month using the following halls:

- Arnold Katz State Concert Hall (2013)
- Philharmonic Chamber Hall (1985)
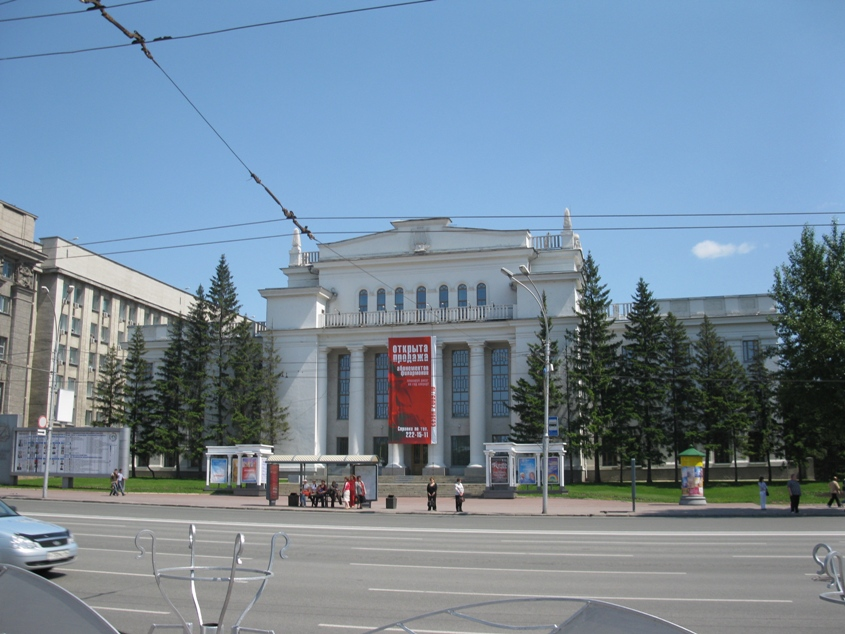
Philharmonic Chamber Hall

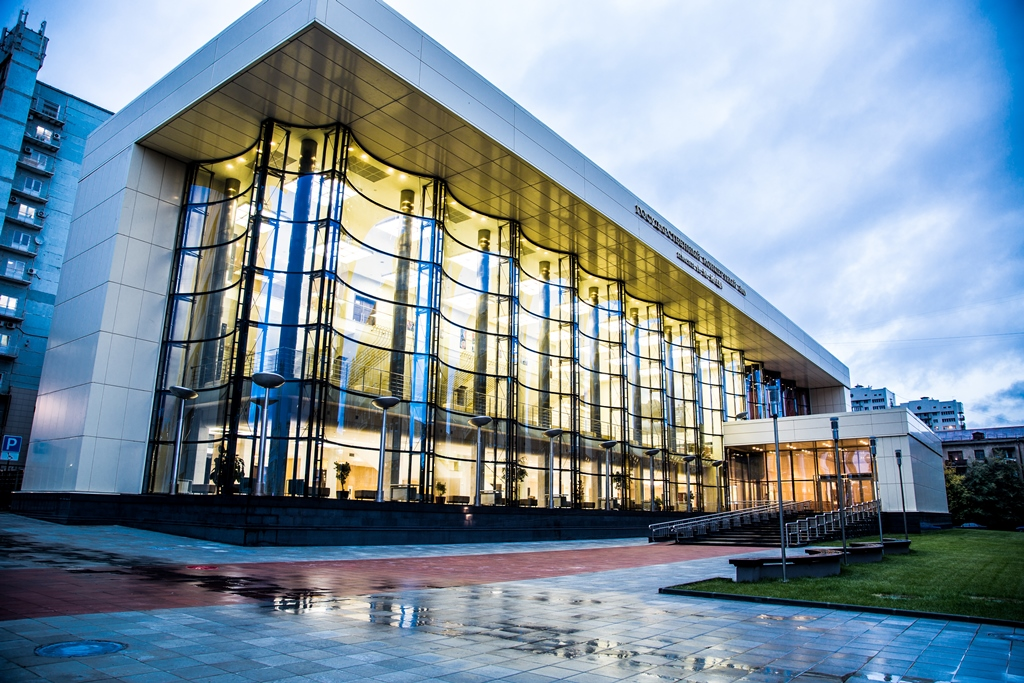
Arnold Katz State Concert Hall

=== Museums ===
- Novosibirsk State Art Museum
- Novosibirsk State Museum of Local Lore
- Museum of Cossacks glory
- Novosibirsk museum of railway equipment named after N.A. Akulinin
- Museum "Siberian Birch Bark"
- Nicholas Roerich Museum
- Museum of the Sun
- Historical and Architectural Museum in the open air
- Siberian Memorial Art Gallery
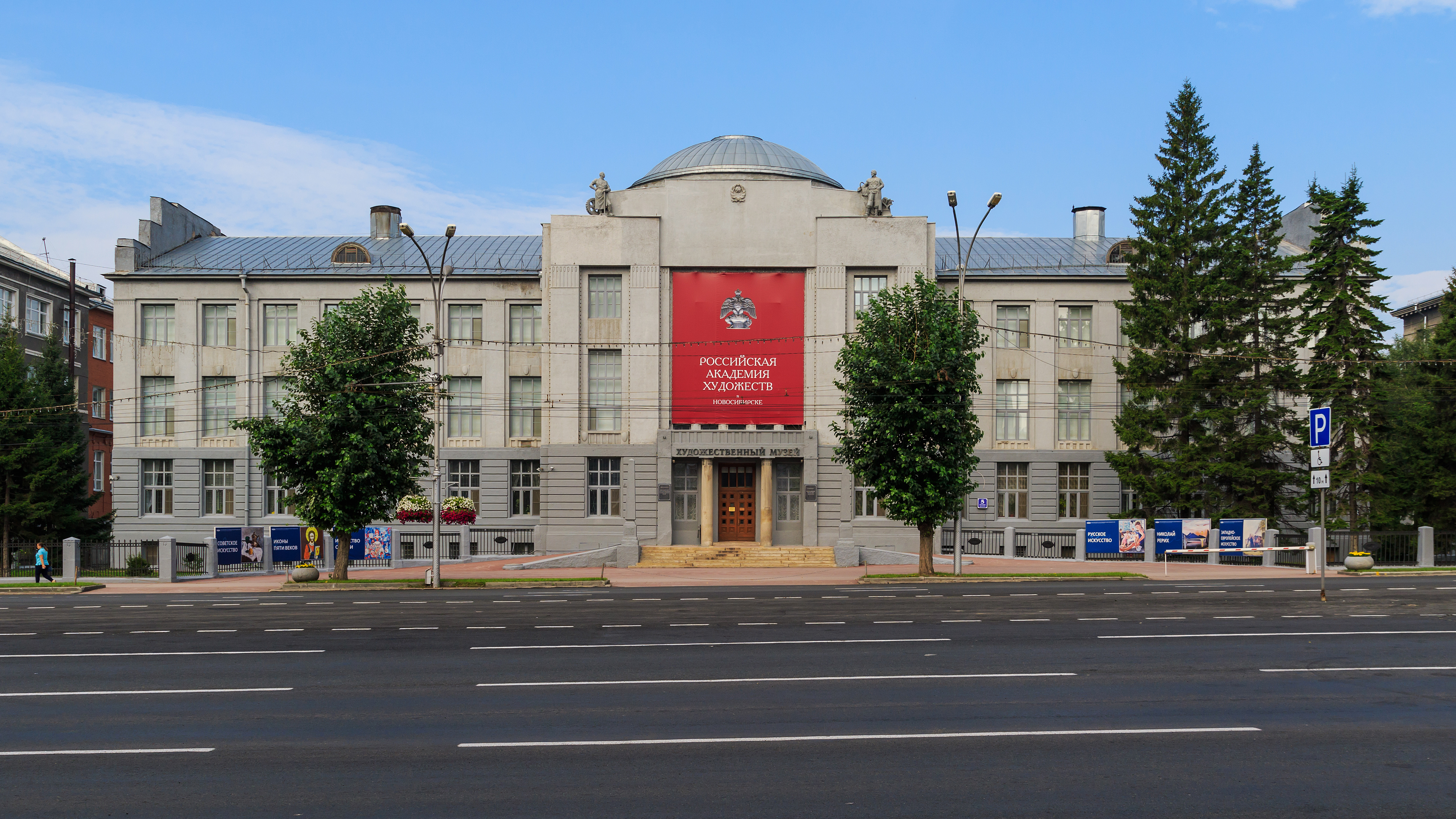
Novosibirsk State Art Museum

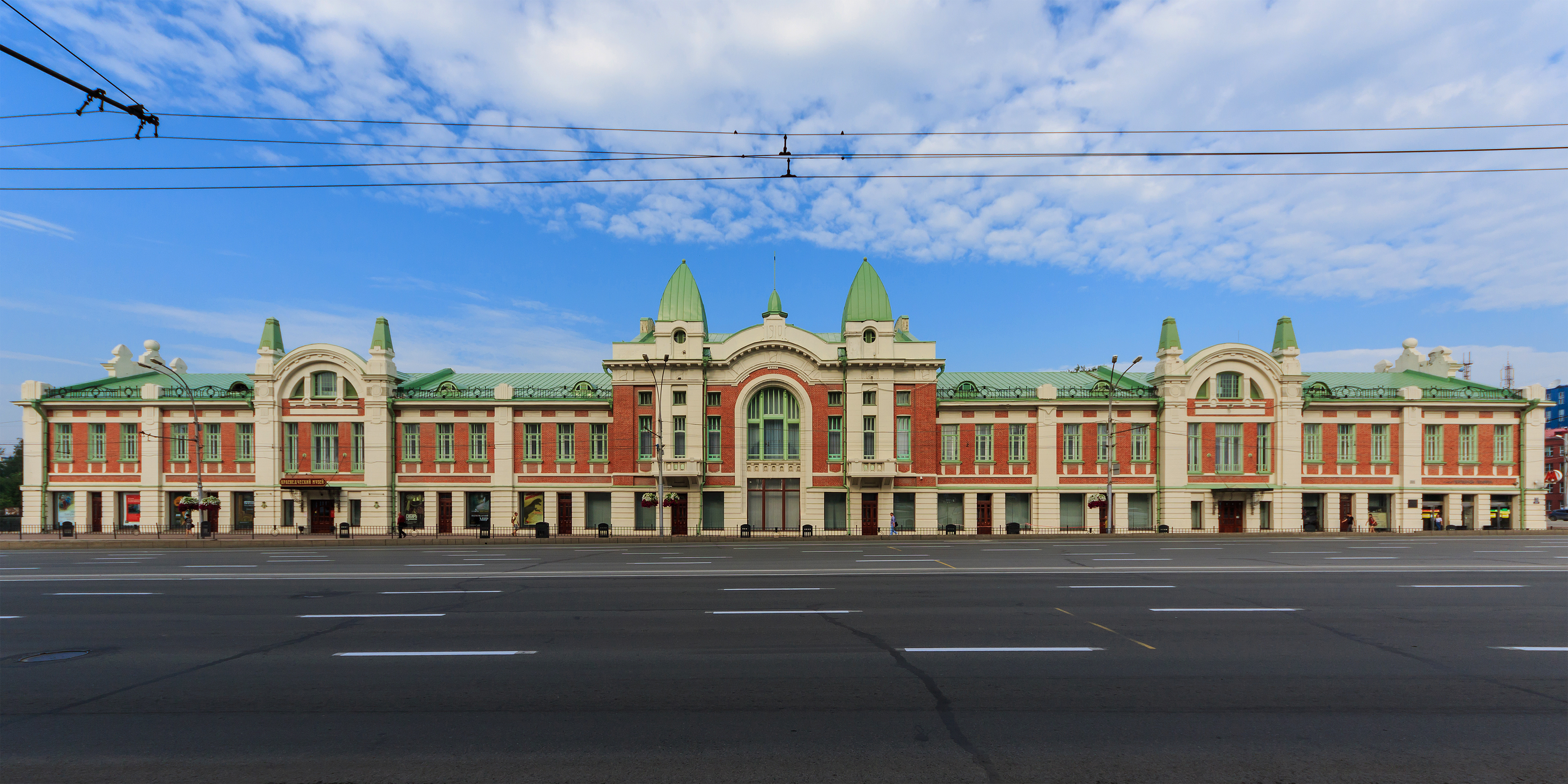
Novosibirsk State Museum of Local Lore

=== Planetariums ===
- Small Novosibirsk Planetarium (1952)
- Large Novosibirsk Planetarium (2012) was awarded in 2015 as the best social infrastructure object in Russia.
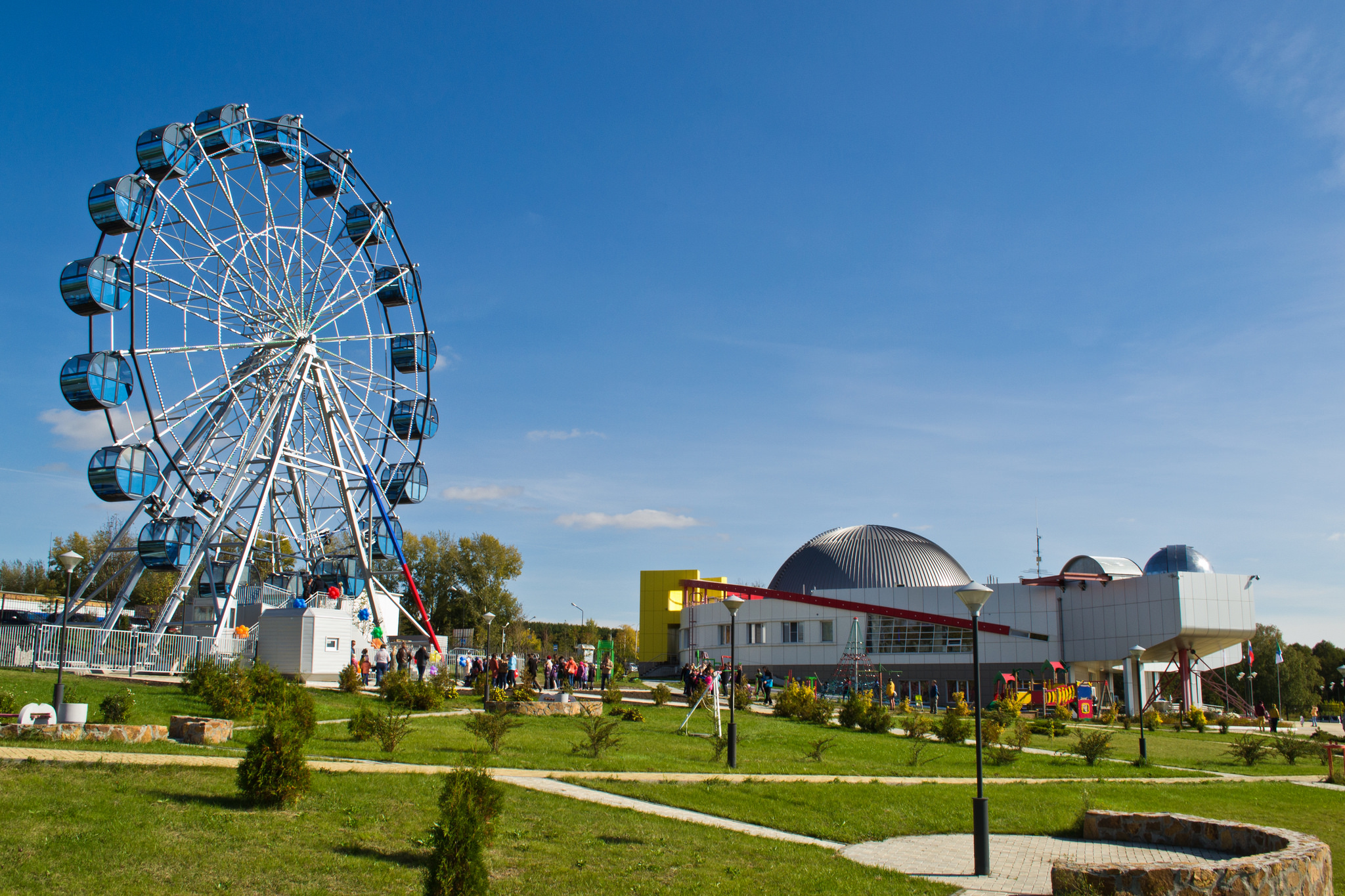
Large Novosibirsk Planetarium

=== Annual festivals, forums and conferences ===
- Siberian Snow Sculpture Festival
- Transsiberian Art Festival
- Monstration
- Festival of children's animation films "Firebird"
- Festival of Youth Subcultures "ZNАКИ"
- Siberian Astronomical Forum
- Documentary Film Festival "Meetings in Siberia"
- Festival of Russian Music "Pokrovskaya autumn"
- SibLegalWeek
- Sib Jazz Fest
- Science Fiction Festival "White Spot"
- Poetry Festival "Very New Miracle"
- International Christmas Festival of Arts

== Places of entertainment ==
=== Cinemas ===
16 cinemas, including Cinema Park which supports IMAX and IMAX 3D.

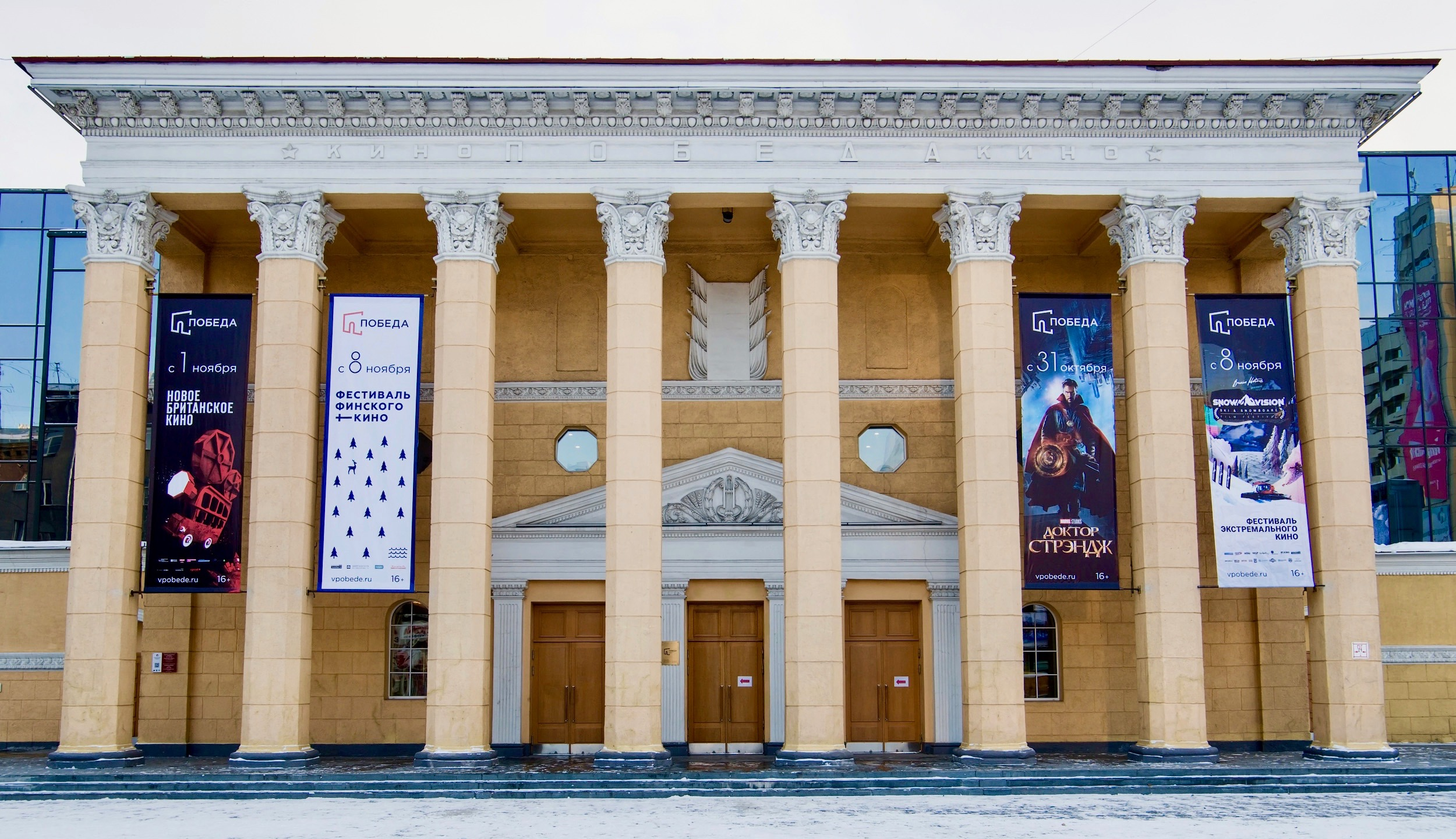
Pobeda Cinema

=== Circus ===
Modern building of the Novosibirsk Circus was built in 1971.

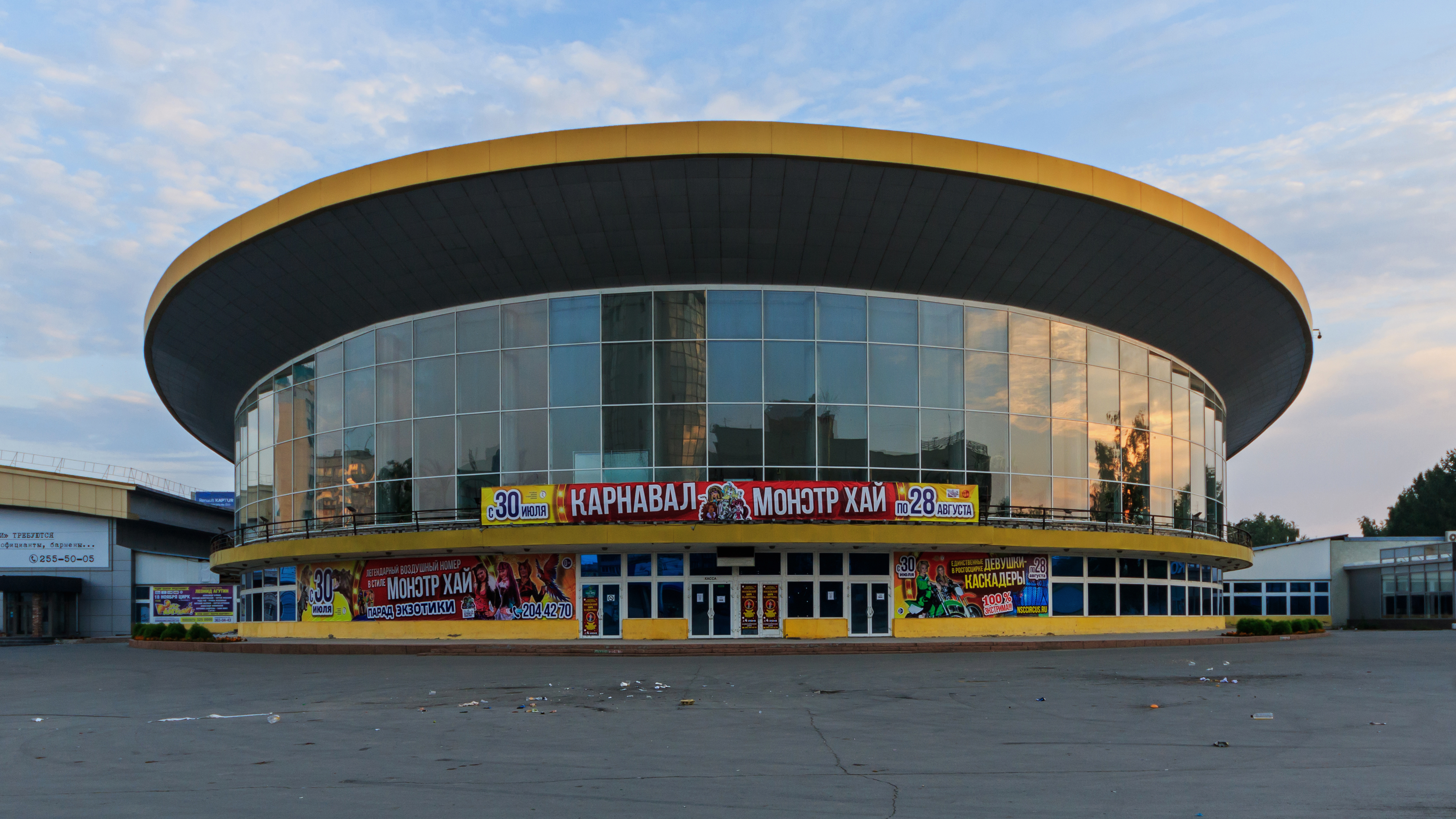
Novosibirsk Circus

=== Zoo ===
The Novosibirsk Zoo is a world-renowned scientific institution as well as a popular tourist attraction.

The zoo has over 11,000 animals from 738 species and is an active participant in thirty-two different captive breeding programmes for endangered species. Since 2016, the Center of oceanography and marine biology "Dolphinia" has been part of the zoo.

On average, around 1.5 million people visit the zoo each year.

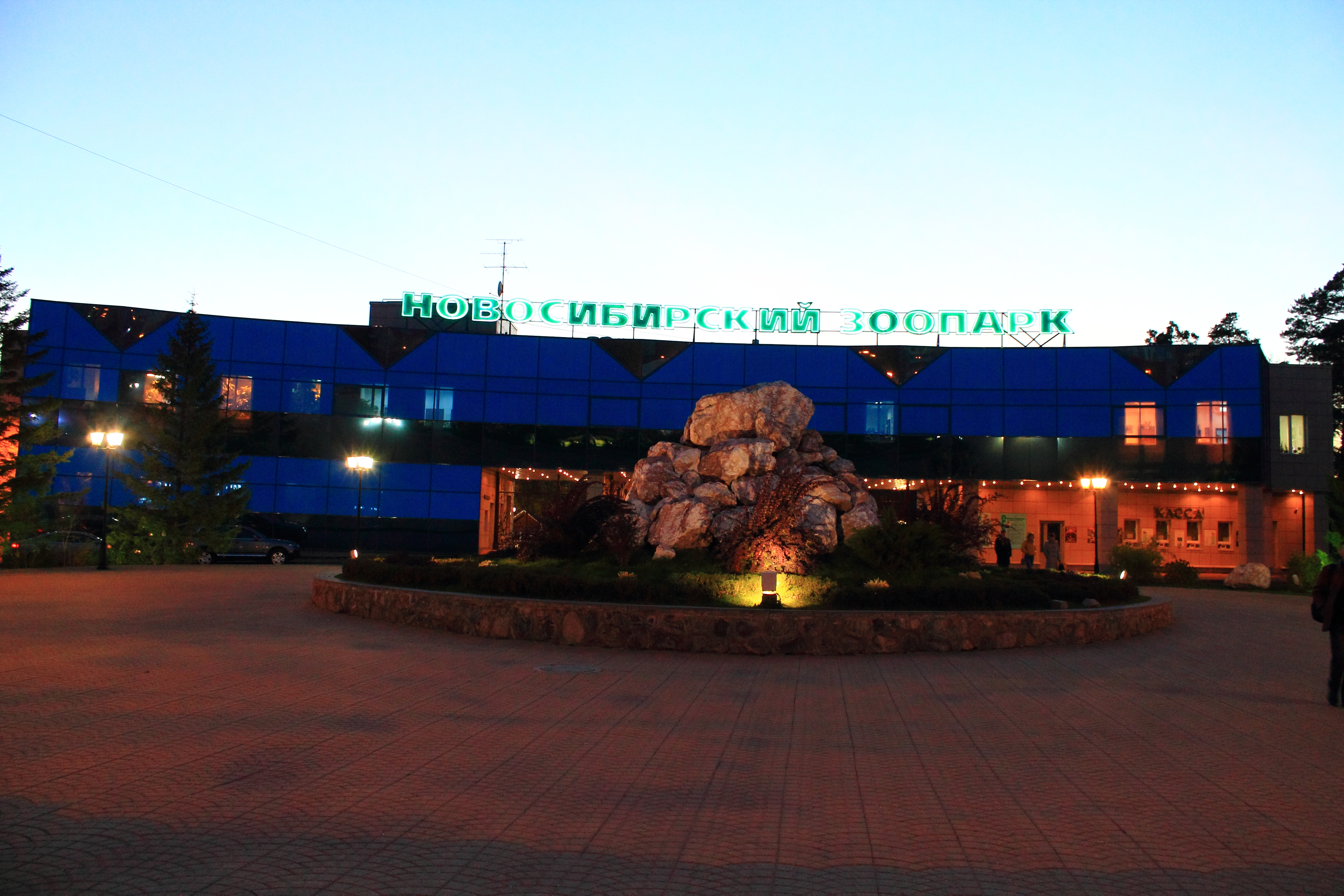
Novosibirsk Zoo in 2015

=== Children's railway ===
Small West Siberian Railway is the children's railway located in Zayeltsovsky Park.

It has 5 stations: Zayeltsovskiy Park, Razyezd Lokomotiv, Sportivnaya, Razyezd Eltsovskiy, Zoopark.

The railway is operational in summer.

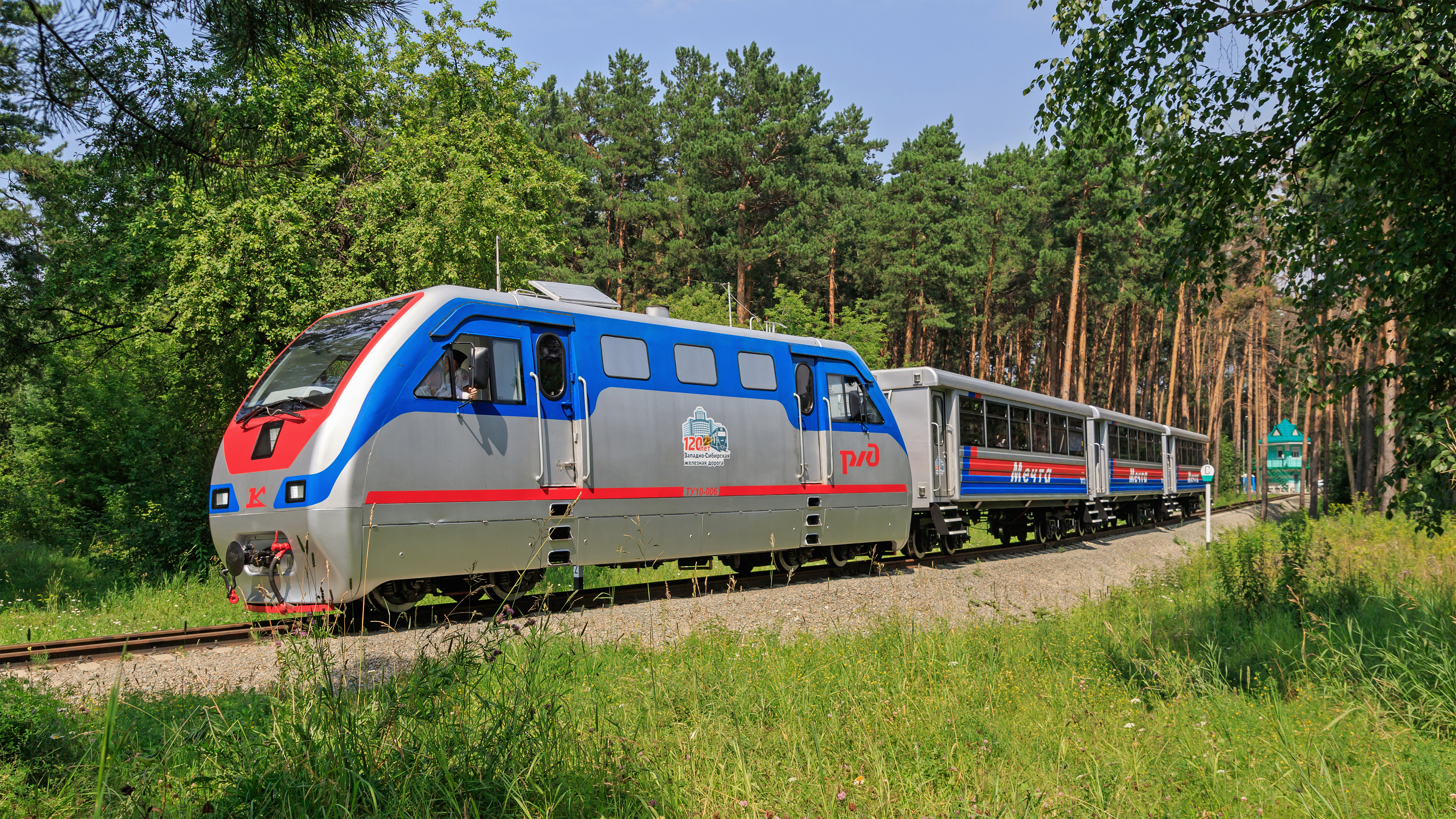
Novosibirsk Children's railway

== Botanical gardens ==
Central Siberian Botanic Garden is located in Akademgorodok.

== Twin towns – sister cities ==
Novosibirsk is twinned with:

- Minneapolis, United States (1989)
- Saint Paul, United States (1989)
- Sapporo, Japan (1990)
- Mianyang, China (1994)
- Daejeon, South Korea (2001)
- Varna, Bulgaria (2008)
- Osh, Kyrgyzstan (2009)
- Kharkiv, Ukraine (2011)
- Minsk, Belarus (2012)
- Shenyang, China (2013)
- Yerevan, Armenia (2014)
- Sevastopol, Ukraine (2014)
- Ulaanbaatar, Mongolia (2015)
- Tiraspol, Moldova (2016)

== Notable residents ==
Violinist Mikhail Simonyan, playwright and prose writer Nina Mikhailovna Sadur, three-time Olympic Greco-Roman wrestling champion Aleksandr Karelin, pop singer Shura, singer and The Voice judge Pelageya, rapper Allj and top model Sofia Steinberg were born and raised in Novosibirsk. Maxim Vengerov, an Israeli violinist, violist, and conductor was born here. Aleksandr Akimov, who was also born here, was the night shift supervisor on duty for Reactor 4 of the Chernobyl Nuclear Plant at the time of the explosion in April 1986. Stanislav Pozdnyakov, fencer and president of the Russian Olympic Commission, was born here.
