= List of town tramway systems in Russia =

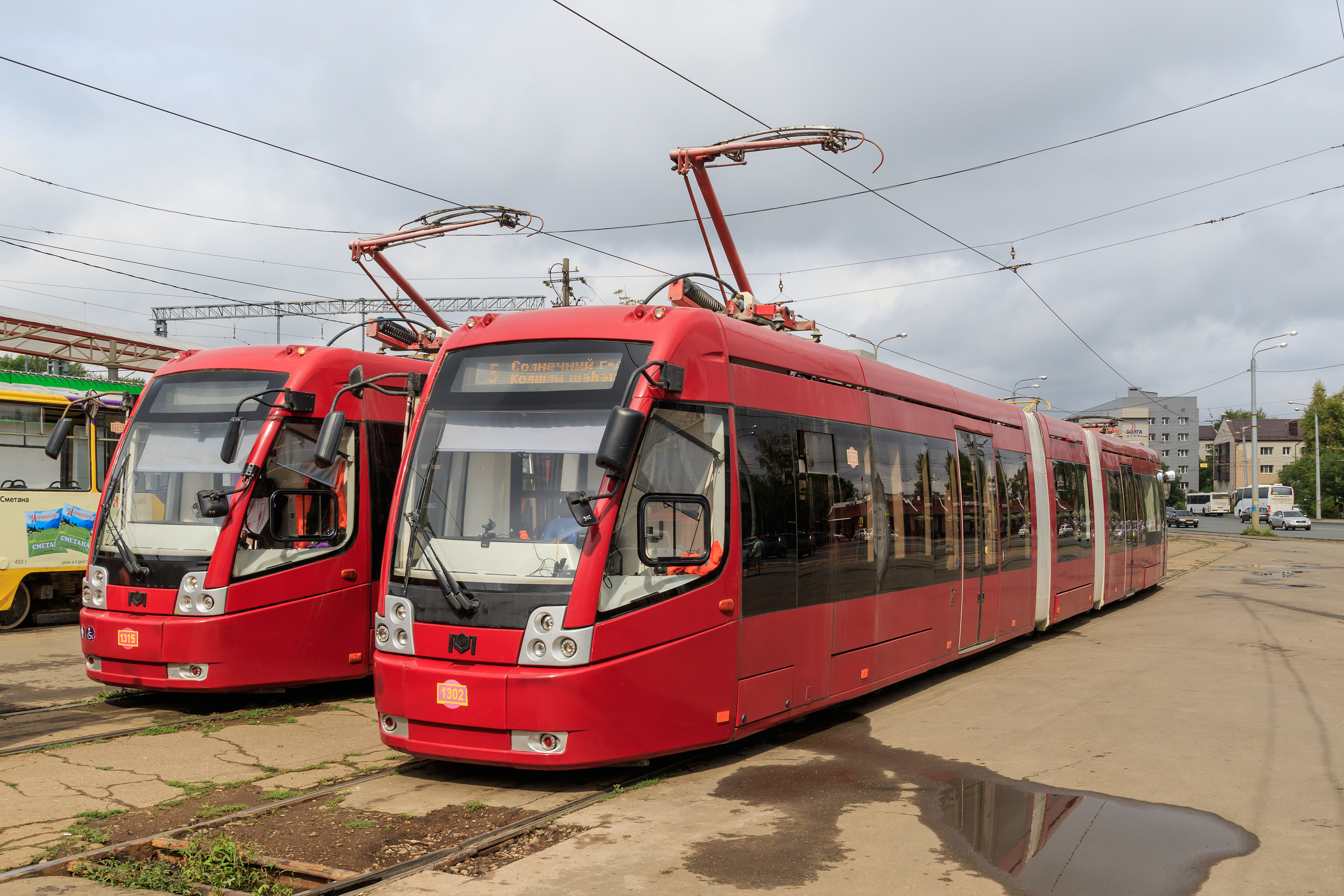
Tram system in Kazan.

This is a list of town tramway systems in Russia by federal district. It includes all tram systems, past and present. Cities with currently operating systems are indicated in bold. The use of the diamond (♦) symbol indicates where there were (or are) two or more independent tram systems operating concurrently within a single metropolitan area. Those tram systems that operated on other than standard-gauge railway track (where known) are indicated in the 'Notes' column.

== Central Federal District ==
Name of system	Location	Traction type	Date (from)	Date (to)	Notes
Trams in Ivanovo	Ivanovo (Иваново)	Electric	8 Nov 1934	2 Jun 2008	Gauge: 1,524 mm (5 ft)
**Trams in Kolomna**	**Kolomna (Коломна)**	Electric	5 Nov 1948	-	Gauge: 1,524 mm (5 ft)
**Trams in Kursk**	**Kursk (Курск)**	Electric	18 Apr 1898	-	Gauge: 1,524 mm (5 ft); Operation suspended April 1918 – October 1924 and November 1941 – September 1943 because of war.
**Trams in Lipetsk**	**Lipetsk (Липецк)**	Electric	7 Nov 1947	-	Gauge: 1,524 mm (5 ft)
**Trams in Moscow**	**Moscow** **(Moskva / Москва)**	Horse	22 Jun 1872	1912	
**Trams in Moscow**	**Moscow** **(Moskva / Москва)**	Steam	29 Jul 1886	1922	
**Trams in Moscow**	**Moscow** **(Moskva / Москва)**	Electric	25 Mar 1899	-	Gauge: 1,524 mm (5 ft). Opened 6 Apr old style.
	♦ Novogireevo (Новогиреево)	Horse	1907(?)	?	Gauge: 1,524 mm (5 ft)
Trams in Noginsk	Noginsk (Ногинск)	Electric	2 Mar 1924	1 Apr 2011	Gauge: 1,524 mm (5 ft); Operation suspended 1992–1994 and 1 April 2011 – 1 June 2012. Fully single track.
**Trams in Oryol**	**Orel (Oryol / Орёл)**	Electric	4 Nov 1898	-	Gauge: 1,524 mm (5 ft); Operation suspended May 1919 – May 1922 and October 1941 – October 1943 because of war.
	Rostov Veliky (Ростов Великий)	Horse	1902	1921	Standard gauge
Trams in Ryazan	Ryazan (Рязань)	Electric	3 Jan 1963	15 Apr 2010	Gauge: 1,524 mm (5 ft)
**Trams in Smolensk**	**Smolensk (Смоленск)**	Electric	20 Oct 1901	-	Gauge: 1,524 mm (5 ft); Operation suspended August 1919 – May 1922 and 15 July 1941 – 6 November 1947 because of war.
**Trams in Stary Oskol**	**Stary Oskol** **(Старый Оскол)**	Electric	4 Jan 1981	-	Gauge: 1,524 mm (5 ft); High speed tramway.
**Trams in Tula**	**Tula (Тула)**	Horse	15 Nov 1888	1919	
**Trams in Tula**	**Tula (Тула)**	Electric	7 Nov 1927	-	Gauge: 1,524 mm (5 ft)
Trams in Tver	Tver (Тверь)	Electric	28 Aug 1901	14 Nov 2018	Gauge: 1,524 mm (5 ft).
Trams in Voronezh	Voronezh (Воронеж)	Horse	23 Aug 1891	1919(?)	
Trams in Voronezh	Voronezh (Воронеж)	Electric	16 May 1926	15 Apr 2009	Gauge: 1,524 mm (5 ft)
**Trams in Yaroslavl**	**Yaroslavl (Ярославль)**	Electric	17 (30) Dec 1900	-	Gauge: 1,524 mm (5 ft)

== Far Eastern Federal District ==
Name of system	Location	Traction type	Date (from)	Date (to)	Notes
	Aniva (Анива)	Horse	?	?	
**Trams in Khabarovsk**	**Khabarovsk (Хабаровск)**	Electric	11 Nov 1956	-	Gauge: 1,524 mm (5 ft)
	Khavomai (Хавомай)	Horse	?	?	
Trams in Komsomolsk-on-Amur	Komsomolsk-na-Amure (Комсомольск-на-Амуре)	Electric	6 Nov 1957	-	Gauge: 1,524 mm (5 ft). Tram network suspended but not formally closed since 10 Jan 2018.
**Trams in Vladivostok**	**Vladivostok (Владивосток)**	Electric	9 Oct 1912	-	Gauge: 1,524 mm (5 ft)

== Siberian Federal District ==
Name of system	Location	Traction type	Date (from)	Date (to)	Notes
**Trams in Barnaul**	**Barnaul (Барнаул)**	Electric	Sep 1949	-	Gauge: 1,524 mm (5 ft); Express tramway opened 26 September 1985.
**Trams in Biysk**	**Biysk (Бийск)**	Electric	13 Jun 1960	-	Gauge: 1,524 mm (5 ft)
**Trams in Irkutsk**	**Irkutsk (Иркутск)**	Electric	3 Aug 1947	-	Gauge: 1,524 mm (5 ft)
**Trams in Angarsk**	♦ **Angarsk (Ангарск)**	Electric	27 Nov 1953	-	Gauge: 1,524 mm (5 ft)
**Trams in Usolye Sibirskoye**	♦ **Usolye Sibirskoye** **(Усолье-Сибирское)**	Electric	16 Feb 1967	-	Gauge: 1,524 mm (5 ft)
**Trams in Kemerovo**	**Kemerovo (Кемерово)**	Electric	1 May 1940	-	Gauge: 1,524 mm (5 ft)
**Trams in Cheryomushki**	**Cheryomushki (Черёмушки)** (Sayano-Shushenskaya Dam)	Electric	18 May 1991	-	Gauge: 1,524 mm (5 ft); Connects railway station with hydropower dam and generating station. Trams are double ended.
**Trams in Krasnoyarsk**	**Krasnoyarsk (Красноярск)**	Electric	29 Apr 1958	-	Gauge: 1,524 mm (5 ft)
**Trams in Krasnoyarsk**	**Krasnoyarsk (Красноярск)**	Horse	1935	?	
**Trams in Achinsk**	**Achinsk (Ачинск)**	Electric	15 Apr 1967	-	Gauge: 1,524 mm (5 ft)
**Trams in Novokuznetsk**	**Novokuznetsk (Новокузнецк)**	Electric	30 Nov 1933	-	Gauge: 1,524 mm (5 ft); Unconnected line on the right bank of the river Tom (Томь) opened 30 November 1969.
**Trams in Osinniki**	**Osinniki (Осинники)**	Electric	1 Nov 1960	-	Gauge: 1,524 mm (5 ft)
**Trams in Propkopyevsk**	**Prokopyevsk (Прокопьевск)**	Electric	18 May 1936	-	Gauge: 1,524 mm (5 ft); Unconnected line in eastern extremity opened 5 November 1956, connected with main Prokopyevsk system 1964.
**Trams in Novosibirsk**	**Novosibirsk (Новосибирск)**	Electric	26 Nov 1934	-	Gauge: 1,524 mm (5 ft); Unconnected lines on the left bank of the river Ob (Обь) opened 4 May 1941. Tramway service across river Ob, 1955–1992.
**Trams in Omsk**	**Omsk (Омск)**	Electric	8 Nov 1936	-	Gauge: 1,524 mm (5 ft)
**Trams in Tomsk**	**Tomsk (Томск)**	Electric	1 May 1949	-	Gauge: 1,524 mm (5 ft)Running in started 25 April 1949.
**Trams in Ulan-Ude**	**Ulan-Ude (Улан-Удэ)**	Electric	16 Dec 1958	-	Gauge: 1,524 mm (5 ft)
Trams in Ust-Ilimsk	Ust-Ilimsk (Усть-Илимск)	Electric	15 Sep 1988	30 Dec 2022	Gauge: 1,524 mm (5 ft); High speed tramway, owned by the timber company that the line serves.
Trams in Malyshev Log	Malyshev Log (Малышев Лог)	Electric	Nov 1957	1961	Gauge: 1,524 mm (5 ft) From Kaltan to a mine

== Northwestern Federal District ==
Name of system	Location	Traction type	Date (from)	Date (to)	Notes
Trams in Arkhangelsk	Arkhangelsk (Архангельск)	Electric	26 Jun 1916	21 Jul 2004	Gauge: 1,524 mm (5 ft); From 1916 until its closure, it was the world's northernmost electric town tramway.
**Trams in Cherepovets**	**Cherepovets (Череповец)**	Electric	19 Oct 1956	-	Gauge: 1,524 mm (5 ft)
**Trams in Kaliningrad**	**Kaliningrad (Калининград)** **(was: Königsberg)**	Horse	26 May 1881	Jun 1901	Gauge: 1,000 mm (3 ft 3 3/8 in)
**Trams in Kaliningrad**	**Kaliningrad (Калининград)** **(was: Königsberg)**	Electric	31 May 1895	-	Gauge: 1,000 mm (3 ft 3 3/8 in); Operation suspended January 1945 – 7 November 1946 because of war.
	Pskov (Псков)	Horse	1 (14) Nov 1909	1911	Gauge: 1,000 mm (3 ft 3 3/8 in)(?)
	Pskov (Псков)	Electric	9 (22) Jan 1912	Jul 1941	Gauge: 1,000 mm (3 ft 3 3/8 in)
Cheryokha horse tram	Cheryokha (Черёха)	Horse	1890	c. 1918	Served resort
**Trams in Saint Petersburg**	**Saint Petersburg** **(Sankt-Peterburg** **/ Санкт-Петербург)**	Horse	27 Aug 1863	Sep 1917	Gauge: 1,524 mm (5 ft)(?)
**Trams in Saint Petersburg**	**Saint Petersburg** **(Sankt-Peterburg** **/ Санкт-Петербург)**	Steam	1882	1922	Gauge: 1,524 mm (5 ft)(?)
**Trams in Saint Petersburg**	**Saint Petersburg** **(Sankt-Peterburg** **/ Санкт-Петербург)**	Electric	29 Sep 1907	-	Gauge: 1,524 mm (5 ft); Operation suspended 8 December 1941 – 15 April 1942 because of war. Until 2002 ranked as world's largest operating town tramway (by system length).
	♦	Steam	?	?	Sankt-Peterburg / Санкт-Петербург - Ozerki / Озерки, Sestroretsk / Сестрорецк - Kurort / Курорт, branch to Lisi Nos (Лисий Нос).
	♦ Popovka (Поповка)	Horse	?	?	Connected Popovka / Поповка with Zakhozhye / Захожье, branch to Peschanka / Песчанка.
	♦ Strelna (Стрельна)	Horse	?	?	
	♦ Vyritsa (Вырица)	Horse	?	?	
	Sovetsk (Советск)	Electric	26 Jul 1901	Oct 1944	Gauge: 1,000 mm (3 ft 3 3/8 in); Closed because of war damage. The tram network only existed while under German control with the town named Tilsit.
	Staraya Russa (Старая Русса)	Steam	11 Jun 1922	1 Oct 1923	Gauge: 1,000 mm (3 ft 3 3/8 in) Steam system did not operate from 1 Oct 1922 to 17 June 1923.
	Staraya Russa (Старая Русса)	Electric	6 Jul 1924	Jul 1941	Gauge: 1,000 mm (3 ft 3 3/8 in) Steam system did not operate from 1 Oct 1922 to 17 June 1923.
Trams in Vyborg	Vyborg (Выборг)	Electric	28 Sep 1912	25 Apr 1957	Gauge: 1,000 mm (3 ft 3 3/8 in); Until 1940 the city was a part of Finland. Operation suspended 23 December 1939 – 22 August 1940, August 1941 – 5 May 1943 and 25 April 1944 – 21 September 1946 because of war. See also: List of town tramway systems in Finland.
Horse tram in Zakhodskoye	Zakhodskoye				Gauge: 750 mm (2 ft 5 1/2 in)

== Southern Federal District ==
Name of system	Location	Traction type	Date (from)	Date (to)	Notes
	Abinsk (Абинск)	Horse	1914	1919	
Trams in Astrakhan	Astrakhan (Астрахань)	Electric	24 Jun 1900	25 Jul 2007	Gauge: 1,524 mm (5 ft); Operation suspended April 1919 – April 1922 because of war. Reintroduction of a light rail line is being proposed by the Draft Master Plan, with the system to be operational by 2025.
Trams in Grozny	Grozny (Грозный)	Electric	7 Nov 1932	Dec 1994	Gauge: 1,524 mm (5 ft); Closed because of war damage. Virtually all tramway infrastructure was destroyed; no plans for reconstruction are known.
	Ilskaya (Ильский)	Horse	1908	1930s	
**Trams in Krasnodar**	**Krasnodar (Краснодар)**	Electric	10 (23) Dec 1900	-	Gauge: 1,524 mm (5 ft)
	♦ Krasnodar (Краснодар) – Pashkovskaya (Пашковская)	Petrol	4 Apr 1912	1914	
	♦ Krasnodar (Краснодар) – Pashkovskaya (Пашковская)	Electric	14 Dec 1914		Connected to main Krasnodar system 1918.
	Krymsk (Крымск)	Horse	1921	1932	
**Trams in Novocherkassk**	**Novocherkassk (Новочеркасск)**	Electric	22 January 1954	-	Gauge: 1,524 mm (5 ft)
	Novorossiysk (Новороссийск)	Electric	30 May 1934	26 Aug 1969	Gauge: 1,524 mm (5 ft)
**Trams in Pyatigorsk**	**Pyatigorsk (Пятигорск)**	Electric	14 Sep 1903	-	Gauge: 1,000 mm (3 ft 3 3/8 in)
**Trams in Rostov-on-Don**	**Rostov-on-Don** **(Ростов-на-Дону)**	Horse	11 Sep 1887	Dec 1902	-
**Trams in Rostov-on-Don**	**Rostov-on-Don** **(Ростов-на-Дону)**	Electric	2 Jan 1902	-	Operation suspended October 1941 – 1 June 1943 because of war.
	♦ Nakhichevan-na-Donu (Нахичевань-на-Дону)	Horse	21 May 1890	Dec 1902	
	♦ Nakhichevan-na-Donu (Нахичевань-на-Дону)	Electric	4 Jan 1903		Nakhichevan amalgamated with Rostov in 1928.
Trams in Shakhty	Shakhty (Шахты)	Electric	7 Nov 1932	7 Dec 2001	Operation suspended 1942 – April 1944 because of war.
**Trams in Taganrog**	**Taganrog (Таганрог)**	Electric	7 Nov 1932	-	Gauge: 1,524 mm (5 ft)
**Trams in Vladikavkaz**	**Vladikavkaz (Владикавказ)**	Electric	3 (16) Aug 1904	-	Gauge: 1,524 mm (5 ft); Operation suspended 1920 – November 1924 because of war.
	Yeysk (Ейск)	Steam	1915	1918	

== Ural Federal District ==
Name of system	Location	Traction type	Date (from)	Date (to)	Notes
**Trams in Chelyabinsk**	**Chelyabinsk (Челябинск)**	Electric	9 Jan 1932	-	Gauge: 1,524 mm (5 ft)
Trams in Kopeysk	♦ Kopeysk (Копейск)	Electric	5 Nov 1949	Feb 1976	
	♦ Chelyabinsk (Челябинск) – Kopeysk (Копейск)	Electric	Feb 1961	Feb 1976	
	Irbit (Ирбит)	Horse	1926	1933	
	Kamensk-Uralsky (Каменск-Уральский)	(Electric)	-	-	Construction started 1949, not completed. There were three separate projects until 1955.
**Trams in Krasnoturinsk**	**Krasnoturinsk (Краснотурьинск)**	Electric	15 Jan 1954	-	Gauge: 1,524 mm (5 ft); Fully single track.
**Trams in Magnitogorsk**	**Magnitogorsk (Магнитогорск)**	Electric	18 Jan 1935	-	Gauge: 1,524 mm (5 ft)
**Trams in Nizhni Tagil**	**Nizhni Tagil** **(Нижний Тагил)**	Electric	28 Feb 1937	-	Gauge: 1,524 mm (5 ft)
**Trams in Orsk**	**Orsk (Орск)**	Electric	5 Dec 1948	-	Gauge: 1,524 mm (5 ft); Unconnected line in eastern extremity opened 12 December 1985. Orsk lies on both banks of the river Ural (Урал), the traditional boundary between Europe and Asia.
	Ust-Katav (Усть-Катав)	Electric	1973	1997	Operation on the test track of Ust-Katav Wagon-Building Plant
**Trams in Volchansk**	**Volchansk (Волчанск)**	Electric	31 Dec 1951	-	Gauge: 1,524 mm (5 ft); Fully single track. Tramway serves a city of just about 10,000 people.
Trams in Karpinsk	♦ Karpinsk (Карпинск)	Electric	26 Jun 1946	1 Oct 1994	Gauge: 1,524 mm (5 ft)
	♦ Volchansk (Волчанск) – Karpinsk (Карпинск)	Electric	Jun 1953	22 Apr 1965	
**Trams in Yekaterinburg**	**Yekaterinburg (Екатеринбург)**	Electric	7 Nov 1929	-	Gauge: 1,524 mm (5 ft)
**Trams in Zlatoust**	**Zlatoust (Златоуст)**	Electric	25 Dec 1934	-	Gauge: 1,524 mm (5 ft)

== Volga Federal District ==
Name of system	Location	Traction type	Date (from)	Date (to)	Notes
**Trams in Izhevsk**	**Izhevsk (Ижевск)**	Electric	18 Nov 1935	-	Gauge: 1,524 mm (5 ft), high speed tram
**Trams in Kazan**	**Kazan (Казань)**	Horse	2 Oct 1875	13 Dec 1899	Gauge: 1,524 mm (5 ft)(?)
**Trams in Kazan**	**Kazan (Казань)**	Electric	2 Dec 1899	-	Gauge: 1,524 mm (5 ft)
	Kirov, Kirov Oblast (Киров)	(Electric)	-	-	Construction started 1942, not completed.
**Trams in Naberezhnye Chelny**	**Naberezhnye Chelny (Набережные Челны)**	Electric	8 Oct 1973	-	Gauge: 1,524 mm (5 ft)
**Trams in Nizhnekamsk**	♦ **Nizhnekamsk (Нижнекамск)**	Electric	15 Feb 1967	-	Gauge: 1,524 mm (5 ft)
**Trams in Nizhny Novgorod (formerly Gorky)**	**Nizhny Novgorod (Нижний Новгород)**	Horse	1908	1918	Gauge: 1,524 mm (5 ft)(?)
**Trams in Nizhny Novgorod (formerly Gorky)**	**Nizhny Novgorod (Нижний Новгород)**	Electric	20 May 1896	-	Gauge: 1,524 mm (5 ft); Operation suspended 1 May 1919 – 2 August 1923 because of war.
Trams in Dzerzhinsk	♦ Dzerzhinsk (Дзержинск)	Electric	7 Nov 1933	18 Dec 2015	Gauge: 1,524 mm (5 ft)
	♦ Bor (Бор)	Horse	?	?	
**Trams in Novotroitsk**	**Novotroitsk (Новотроицк)**	Electric	5 Nov 1956	-	Gauge: 1,524 mm (5 ft); See also: Orsk (above).
	Penza (Пенза)	Diesel	1935	1937	
**Trams in Perm**	**Perm (Пермь)**	Electric	7 Nov 1929	-	Gauge: 1,524 mm (5 ft); Unconnected line to southwest (Osentsy / Oсенцы) opened 25 October 1957. Connected with main Perm system December 1958.
**Trams in Salavat**	**Salavat (Салават)**	Electric	29 Jul 1957	-	Gauge: 1,524 mm (5 ft)
**Trams in Samara**	**Samara (Самара)**	Horse	22 Jul 1895	1917	Gauge: 1,524 mm (5 ft)
**Trams in Samara**	**Samara (Самара)**	Electric	25 Feb 1915	-	Gauge: 1,524 mm (5 ft); Operation suspended 1 March 1919 – 20 July 1920 because of war.
**Trams in Saratov**	**Saratov (Саратов)**	Horse	13 May 1887	1909	Gauge: 1,524 mm (5 ft)
**Trams in Saratov**	**Saratov (Саратов)**	Electric	22 Oct 1908	-	Gauge: 1,524 mm (5 ft); Express tramway opened 1974.
**Trams in Ufa**	**Ufa (Уфа)**	Electric	1 Feb 1937	-	Gauge: 1,524 mm (5 ft)
	♦ Chernikovsk (Черниковск)	Electric	16 Aug 1956		Gauge: 1,524 mm (5 ft); Chernikovsk amalgamated with Ufa in 1956, tramway lines connected in 1958.
**Trams in Ulyanovsk**	**Ulyanovsk (Ульяновск)**	Electric	5 Jan 1954	-	Gauge: 1,524 mm (5 ft)
**Trams in Volgograd**	**Volgograd (Волгоград)**	Electric	22 Apr 1913	-	Gauge: 1,524 mm (5 ft); Operation suspended 1920 – 1922 and 23 August 1942 – 26 December 1943 because of war. High speed tramway, initial surface segment opened 1 May 1972. Underground segment opened 5 November 1984.
**Trams in Volgograd**	♦ **Krasnoarmeysky** **(Красноармейский)**	Electric	6 Nov 1958	-	Gauge: 1,524 mm (5 ft); Unconnected line in southern Volgograd. Depot combined with trolleybus
**Trams in Volzhsky**	♦ **Volzhsky (Волжский)**	Electric	30 Dec 1963	-	Gauge: 1,524 mm (5 ft)

== See also ==
- List of town tramway systems in Europe
- List of trolleybus systems in Russia
- List of tram and light rail transit systems
- List of metro systems
