= Volchikha =

Topics referred to by the same term

Volchikha (Russian: Волчиха) is the name of several rural localities in Russia.

== Altai Krai ==
As of 2010, one rural locality in Altai Krai bears this name:

- Volchikha, Altai Krai, a selo in Volchikhinsky Selsoviet of Volchikhinsky District

== Kirov Oblast ==
As of 2010, one rural locality in Kirov Oblast bears this name:

- Volchikha, Kirov Oblast, a village in Grekhovsky Rural Okrug of Sovetsky District

== Nizhny Novgorod Oblast ==
As of 2010, seven rural localities in Nizhny Novgorod Oblast bear this name:

- Volchikha, Bor, Nizhny Novgorod Oblast, a village in Lindovsky Selsoviet of the town of oblast significance of Bor
- Volchikha, Balakhonikhinsky Selsoviet, Arzamassky District, Nizhny Novgorod Oblast, a village in Balakhonikhinsky Selsoviet of Arzamassky District
- Volchikha, Lomovsky Selsoviet, Arzamassky District, Nizhny Novgorod Oblast, a selo in Lomovsky Selsoviet of Arzamassky District
- Volchikha, Kstovsky District, Nizhny Novgorod Oblast, a village in Prokoshevsky Selsoviet of Kstovsky District
- Volchikha, Lukoyanovsky District, Nizhny Novgorod Oblast, a village in Tolsko-Maydansky Selsoviet of Lukoyanovsky District
- Volchikha, Lyskovsky District, Nizhny Novgorod Oblast, a village in Berendeyevsky Selsoviet of Lyskovsky District
- Volchikha, Sosnovsky District, Nizhny Novgorod Oblast, a village in Vitkulovsky Selsoviet of Sosnovsky District

== Vologda Oblast ==
As of 2010, two rural localities in Vologda Oblast bear this name:

- Volchikha, Kharovsky District, Vologda Oblast, a village in Kharovsky Selsoviet of Kharovsky District
- Volchikha, Vozhegodsky District, Vologda Oblast, a village in Maryinsky Selsoviet of Vozhegodsky District
