= Vostrovo =

Vostrovo Вострово
- Selo
- Location within Altai Krai Location within Russia
- Coordinates: 52°08′N 80°37′E
- Country: Russia
- Region: Altai Krai
- District: Volchikhinsky District
- Time zone: UTC+7:00

Vostrovo (Russian: Вострово) is a rural locality (a selo) and the administrative center of Vostrovsky Selsoviet, Volchikhinsky District, Altai Krai, Russia. The population was 1,252 as of 2013. It was founded in 1806. There are 8 streets.

== Geography ==
Vostrovo is located 25 km northeast of Volchikha (the district's administrative centre) by road. Priborovoye is the nearest rural locality.
