= Selivyorstovo =

Selivyorstovo Селивёрстово
- Village
- Location within Altai Krai Location within Russia
- Coordinates: 52°17′N 80°56′E
- Country: Russia
- Region: Altai Krai
- District: Volchikhinsky District
- Time zone: UTC+7:00

Selivyorstovo (Russian: Селивёрстово) is a rural locality (a selo) and the administrative center of Selivyorstovsky Selsoviet of Volchikhinsky District, Altai Krai, Russia. The population was 659 as of 2016. It was founded in 1800. There are 8 streets.

== Geography ==
Selivyorstovo is located 56 km northeast of Volchikha (the district's administrative centre) by road. Vesyolaya Dubrava is the nearest rural locality.

== Ethnicity ==
The village is inhabited by Russians and others.
