= Beryozovsky, Altai Krai =

Beryozovsky Берёзовский
- Settlement
- Location within Altai Krai Location within Russia
- Coordinates: 52°04′N 80°06′E
- Country: Russia
- Region: Altai Krai
- District: Volchikhinsky District
- Time zone: UTC+7:00

Beryozovsky (Russian: Берёзовский) is a rural locality (a settlement) and the administrative center of Beryozovsky Selsoviet of Volchikhinsky District, Altai Krai, Russia. The population was 519 as of 2016. It was founded in 1954. There are 12 streets.

== Geography ==
Beryozovsky is located 28 km northwest of Volchikha (the district's administrative centre) by road. Novokormikha is the nearest rural locality.
