= Priborovoye =

Priborovoye Приборовое
- Selo
- Location within Altai Krai Location within Russia
- Coordinates: 52°09′N 80°40′E
- Country: Russia
- Region: Altai Krai
- District: Volchikhinsky District
- Time zone: UTC+7:00

Priborovoye (Russian: Приборовое) is a rural locality (a selo) in Vostrovsky Selsoviet, Volchikhinsky District, Altai Krai, Russia. The population was 372 as of 2013. It was founded in 1994. There are 3 streets.

== Geography ==
Priborovoye is located 26 km northeast of Volchikha (the district's administrative centre) by road. Vostrovo is the nearest rural locality.
