= Novokormikha =

Novokormikha Новокормиха
- Village
- Location within Altai Krai Location within Russia
- Coordinates: 52°09′N 80°04′E
- Country: Russia
- Region: Altai Krai
- District: Volchikhinsky District
- Time zone: UTC+7:00

Novokormikha (Russian: Новокормиха) is a rural locality (a selo) and the administrative center of Novokormikhinsky Selsoviet of Volchikhinsky District, Altai Krai, Russia. The population was 434 as of 2016. It was founded in 1810. There are 7 streets.

== Geography ==
Novokormikha is located 31 km northwest of Volchikha (the district's administrative centre) by road. Komintern is the nearest rural locality.
