= Plodosovkhoz =

Plodosovkhoz Плодосовхоз
- Settlement
- Location within Altai Krai Location within Russia
- Coordinates: 51°59′N 80°17′E
- Country: Russia
- Region: Altai Krai
- District: Volchikhinsky District
- Time zone: UTC+7:00

Plodosovkhoz (Russian: Плодосовхоз) is a rural locality (a settlement) in Volchikhinsky Selsoviet, Volchikhinsky District, Altai Krai, Russia. The population was 148 as of 2013. There are 3 streets.

== Geography ==
Plodosovkhoz is located 6 km southwest of Volchikha (the district's administrative centre) by road. Volchikha is the nearest rural locality.
