= Pyatkov Log =

Pyatkov Log Пятков Лог
- Village
- Location within Altai Krai Location within Russia
- Coordinates: 52°13′N 80°16′E
- Country: Russia
- Region: Altai Krai
- District: Volchikhinsky District
- Time zone: UTC+7:00

Pyatkov Log (Russian: Пятков Лог) is a rural locality (a selo) and the administrative center of Pyatkovlogovsky Selsoviet of Volchikhinsky District, Altai Krai, Russia. The population was 350 as of 2016. It was founded in 1920. There are 2 streets.

== Geography ==
Pyatkov Log is located 39 km north of Volchikha (the district's administrative centre) by road. Komintern is the nearest rural locality.

== Ethnicity ==
The village is inhabited by Ukrainians and others.
