= Ust-Volchikha =

Ust-Volchikha Усть-Волчиха
- Selo
- Location within Altai Krai Location within Russia
- Coordinates: 51°53′N 80°15′E
- Country: Russia
- Region: Altai Krai
- District: Volchikhinsky District
- Time zone: UTC+7:00

Ust-Volchikha (Russian: Усть-Волчиха) is a rural locality (a selo) and the administrative center of Ust-Volchikhinsky Selsoviet, Volchikhinsky District, Altai Krai, Russia. The population was 941 as of 2013. It was founded in 1812. There are 9 streets.

== Geography ==
Ust-Volchikha is located 17 km southwest of Volchikha (the district's administrative centre) by road. Bor-Forpost is the nearest rural locality.
