= Ust-Kormikha =

Ust-Kormikha Усть-Кормиха
- Selo
- Location within Altai Krai Location within Russia
- Coordinates: 51°49′N 80°21′E
- Country: Russia
- Region: Altai Krai
- District: Volchikhinsky District
- Time zone: UTC+7:00

Ust-Kormikha (Russian: Усть-Кормиха) is a rural locality (a selo) in Ust-Volchikhinsky Selsoviet, Volchikhinsky District, Altai Krai, Russia. The population was 108 as of 2013. There is 1 street.

== Geography ==
Ust-Kormikha is located 28 km south of Volchikha (the district's administrative centre) by road. Valovoy Kordon is the nearest rural locality.
