= Solonovka =

Solonovka Солоновка
- Village
- Location within Altai Krai Location within Russia
- Coordinates: 52°13′N 80°48′E
- Country: Russia
- Region: Altai Krai
- District: Volchikhinsky District
- Time zone: UTC+7:00

Solonovka (Russian: Солоновка) is a rural locality (a selo) and the administrative center of Solonovsky Selsoviet of Volchikhinsky District, Altai Krai, Russia. The population was 830 as of 2016. It was founded in 1867. There are 7 streets.

== Geography ==
Solonovka is located 40 km northeast of Volchikha (the district's administrative centre) by road. Malyshev Log is the nearest rural locality.

== Ethnicity ==
The village is inhabited by Russians and others.
