= Tatra K2 =

First production Czechoslovak articulated tramcar (1966–1983)

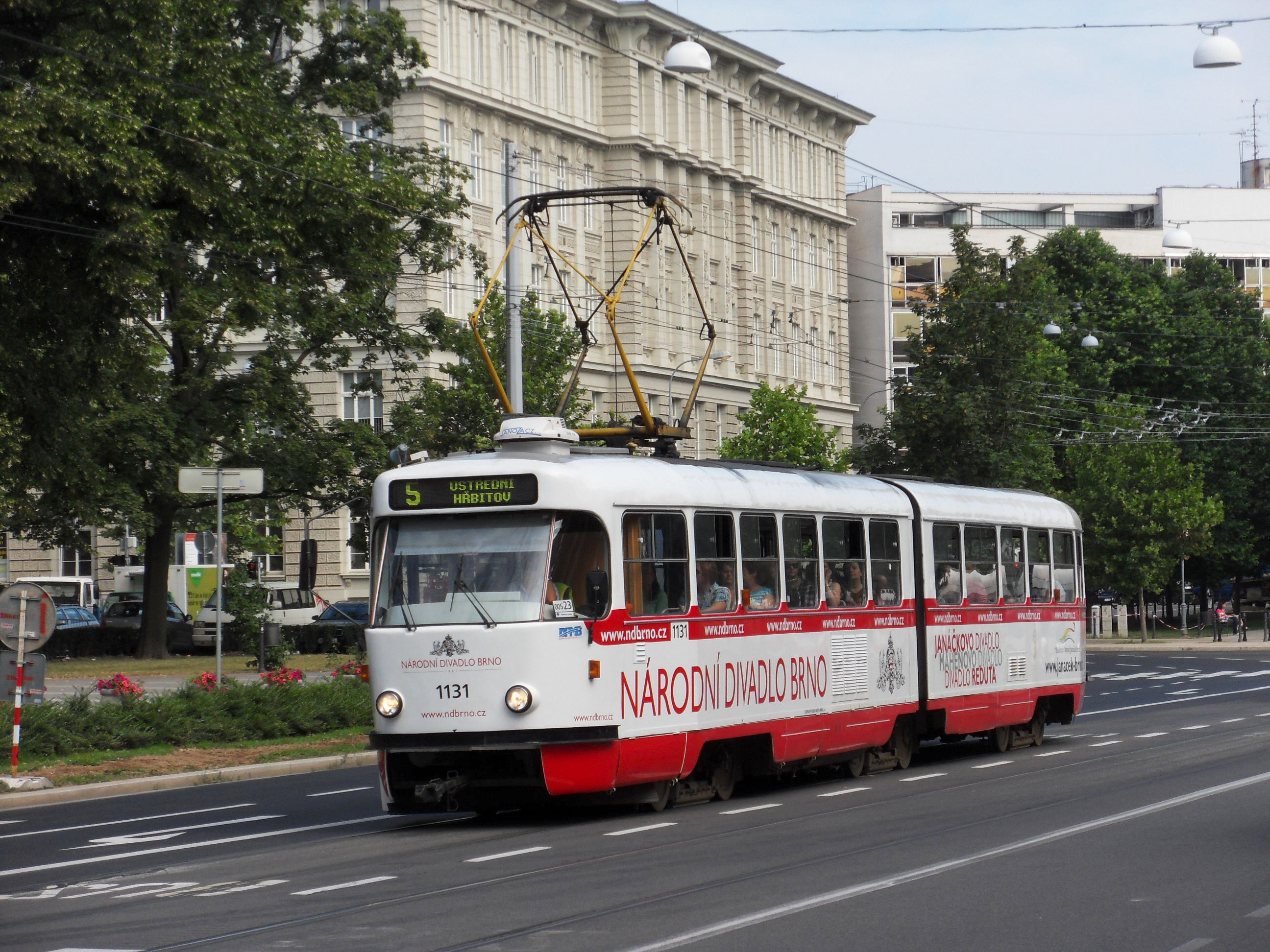
- Tatra K2 in Brno

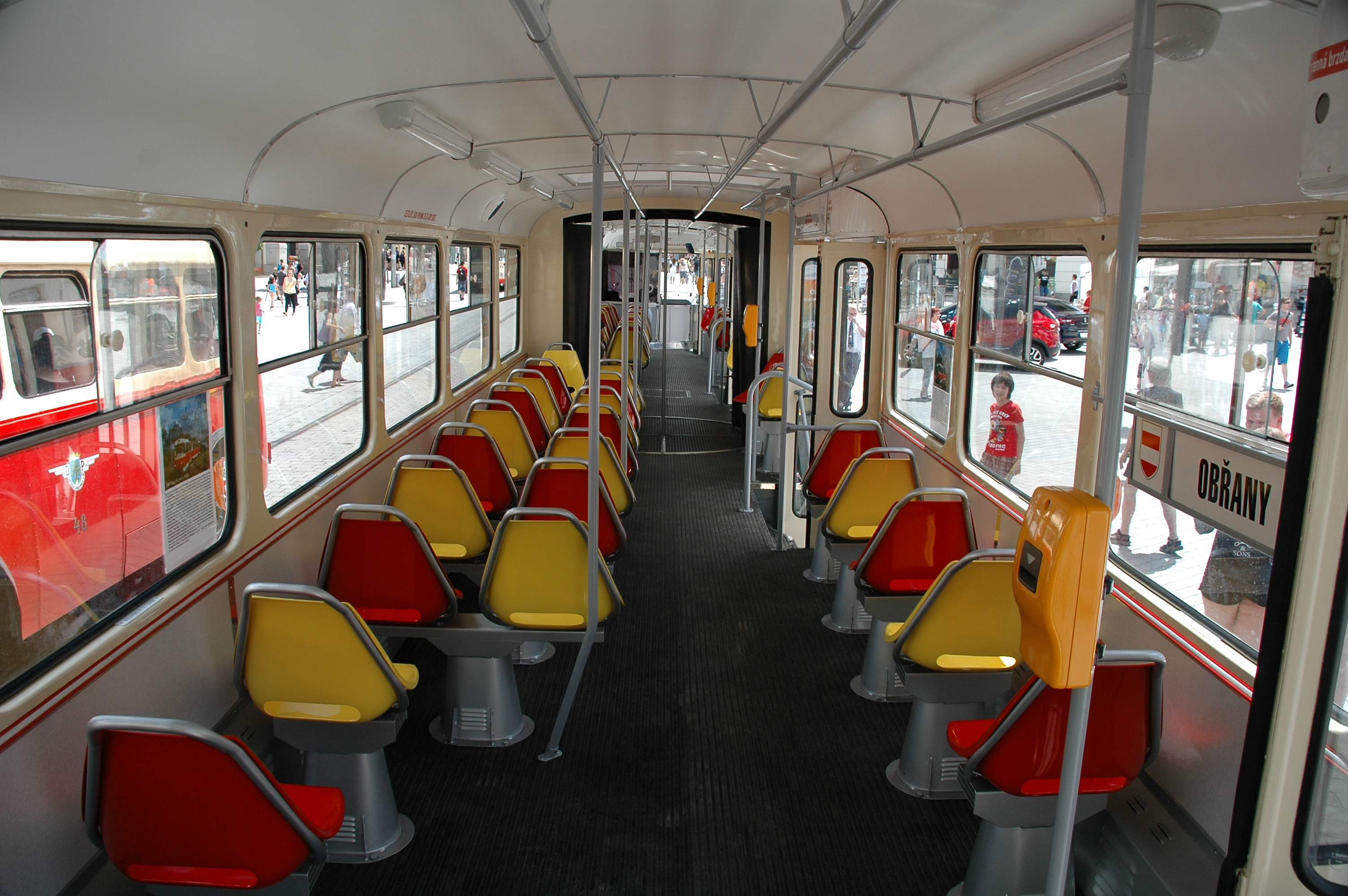
- Interior
- Manufacturer: ČKD Tatra
- Assembly: (Czechoslovakia) Prague
- Family name: Tatra
- Constructed: 1966–1983
- Number built: 569
- Capacity: 158

Specifications
- Car length: 20,260 mm (66 ft 6 in)
- Width: 2,500 mm (8 ft 2 in)
- Height: 3,050 mm (10 ft 0 in)
- Doors: 4
- Maximum speed: 60 km/h (37 mph)
- Weight: 21,900 kg (48,300 lb)
- Engine type: TE 022
- Traction motors: 4
- Power output: 4×40 kW
- Electric system: 600 V DC
- Current collection: pantograph
- Wheels driven: 4
- Bogies: 3
- Coupling system: Prague-type coupling
- Track gauge: 1,000 mm (3 ft 3 3/8 in), 1,435 mm (4 ft 8 1/2 in), 1,524 mm (5 ft)

The Tatra K2 was the first production articulated tramcar built by ČKD Tatra between 1966 and 1983, following the failure of the experimental prototypes K1 which never entered production. It was noted that the main problem with the K1 was with the new electrical equipment, and therefore the electrical equipment of the T3 (TR 37) was modified and incorporated into the new K2 (UA 12). The prototype entered service in 1966 as Prague tramcar number 7001, where it spent only a short spell, then it was exhibited at MSV 1966 in Brno (International Engineering Trade Fair) with the number 7000, before being transferred to Most, and then again moved to Brno (1968), where it at first had number 607 and later in the year 1969 it was changed to 1007. Production of the K2 on a mass scale started the same year, and many examples was operated in the year 2020, albeit most having been extensively modernised. The modernisation of the K2 fleet in Brno, the biggest customer of the type, included the complete re-modelling of the front end, and the upgrading of their electronic equipment. These modernised examples were labeled K2R, whereby the 'R' stands for czech word rekonstrukce (in translate 'reconstructed'). 2 cars were rebuilt into Pars Nova K3R-N (numbers 1751-1752). From this car was derived a type Tatra K5 in the year 1968.

The last Brno K2, 1080, was retired from service on 19 April 2026.

== Variations ==
=== K2SU ===
The K2SU was the version of the K2 which went on sale in Russia, also in 1966. Production of the type ended prematurely in 1970 as the vehicles were not well suited to the comparatively heavy traffic in Russian cities. Nevertheless, a total of 246 of the type entered service. The only K2SU to remain in active service was in Yekaterinburg where it was retained as an historic vehicle until 1998.

=== K2YU ===
Sarajevo was the only city in the former Yugoslavia to receive the K2, where it was labeled the K2YU. The only differences with the original K2 were in very minor details. One of the most noticeable differences were the corrugated sides and the pantograph, which was in the first series located at the rear of the tram, instead of the front (however it was eventually moved to the front in the 2000s for easier access). Other series already had a pantograph located at the front.

From undelivered shipment of twenty trams K2YU for Sarajevo in 1983, 15 trams ended up in Brno (numbers 1118–1132), 3 were shipped to Bratislava (numbers 7085–7087) and the last 2 to Ostrava (numbers 810–811).

== Production ==
A total of 567 units entered service in the following cities:

Country	City	Type	Delivery years	Number	Fleet numbers	
Czechoslovakia	Bratislava	K2	1969 – 1977	86	309–394	
Czechoslovakia	Bratislava	K2YU	1983	3	7085–7087	
Czechoslovakia	Brno	K2	1967 – 1983	120	601–607, 1008–1117	numbers 1024, 1046 and 1105 were occupied twice
Czechoslovakia	Brno	K2YU	1983	15	1118–1132	
Czechoslovakia	Ostrava	K2	1966 – 1969	8	802–809	
Czechoslovakia	Ostrava	K2YU	1983	2	810–811	
Yugoslavia	Sarajevo	K2YU	1973 – 1983	90	201–290	
Soviet Union	Kharkiv	K2SU	1968 – 1969	40	1901–1940	
Soviet Union	Kuybyshev	K2SU	1967 – 1969	30	1001–1030	
Soviet Union	Moscow	K2SU	1967 – 1970	60	151–211	
Soviet Union	Novosibirsk	K2SU	1967 – 1969	36	121–156	
Soviet Union	Rostov-on-Don	K2SU	1968	5	1001–1005	
Soviet Union	Sverdlovsk	K2SU	1967 – 1969	20	801–820	
Soviet Union	Tula	K2SU	1969 – 1970	19	401–419	
Soviet Union	Ufa	K2SU	1968 – 1969	35		
Total:				569		

== Photo gallery ==
Tatra K2

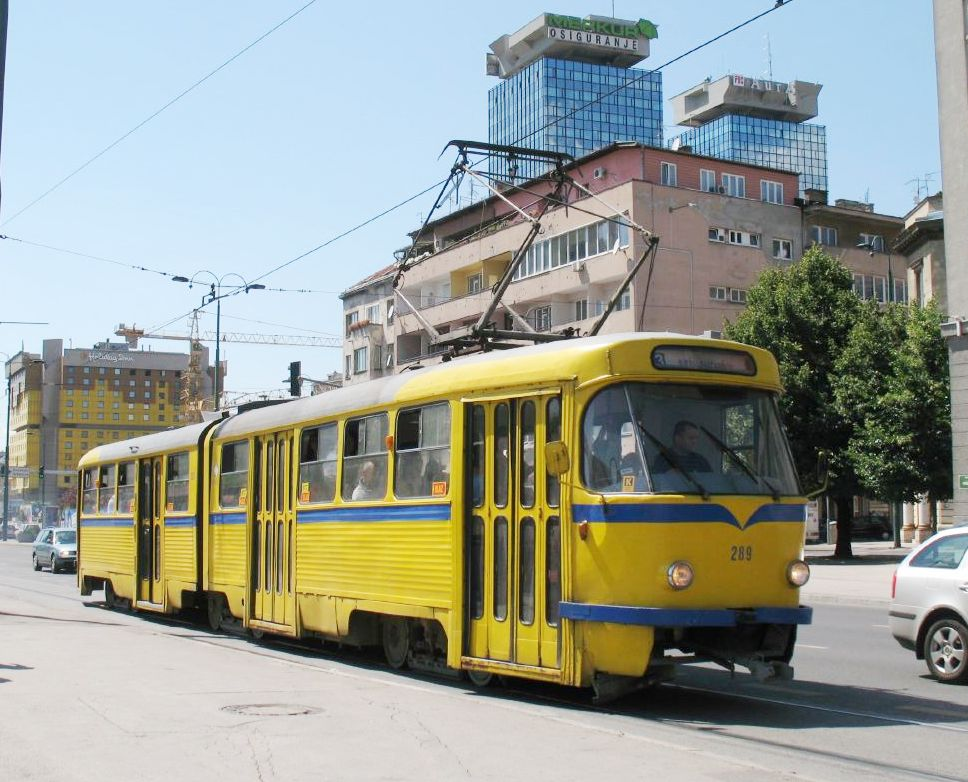
K2YU tram in Sarajevo

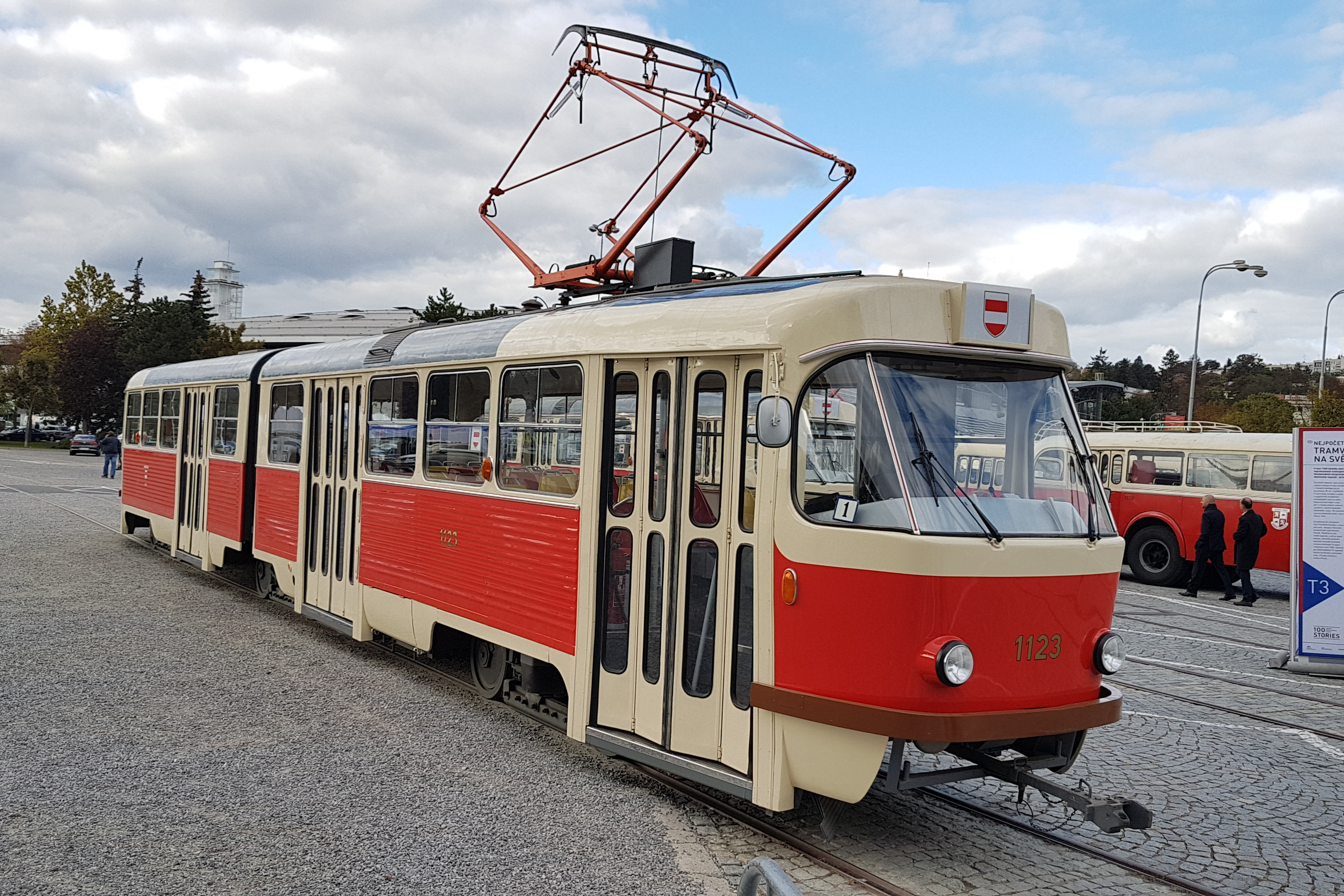
Historic tram type K2YU in Brno

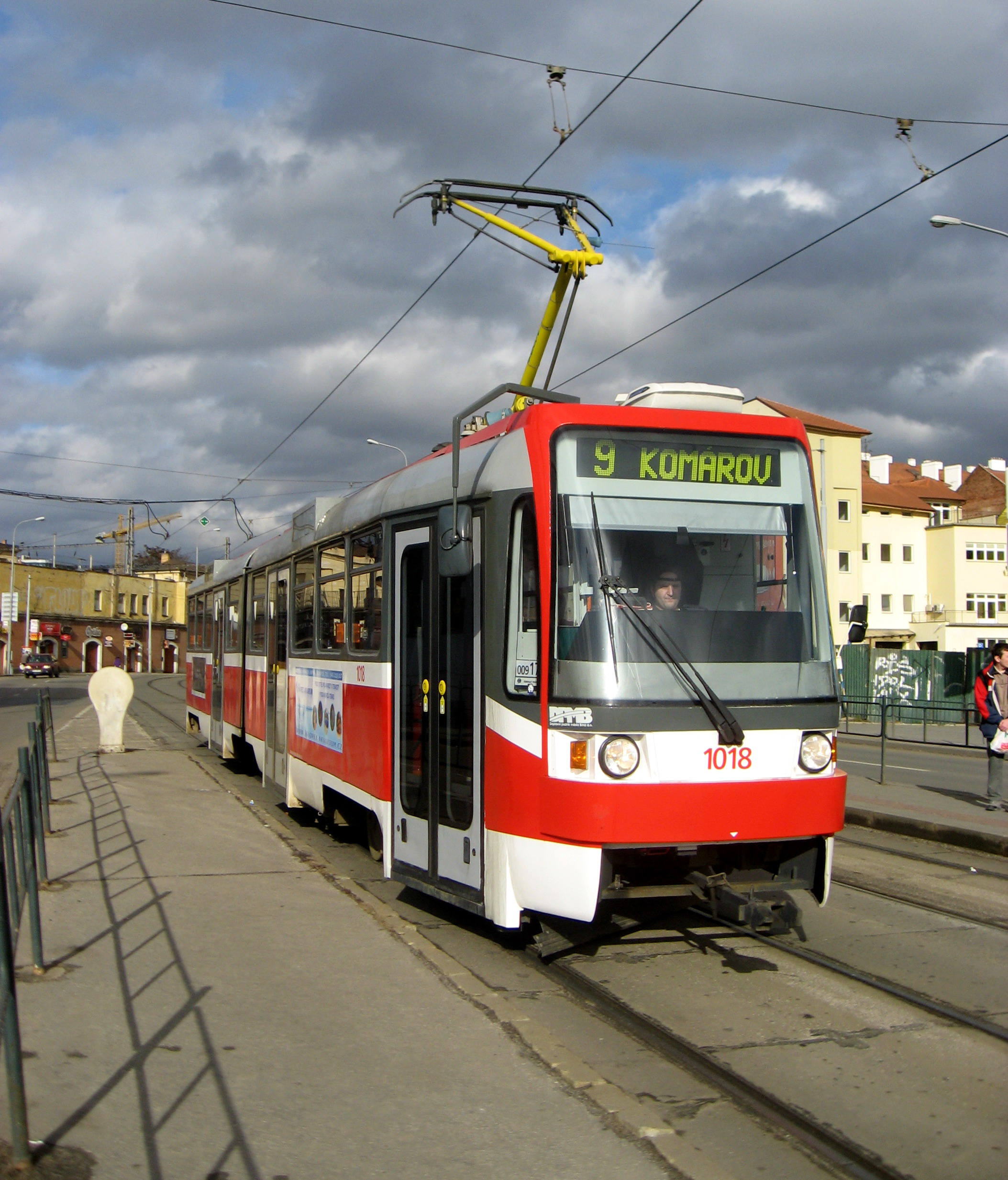
Modernized tram type K2R in Brno

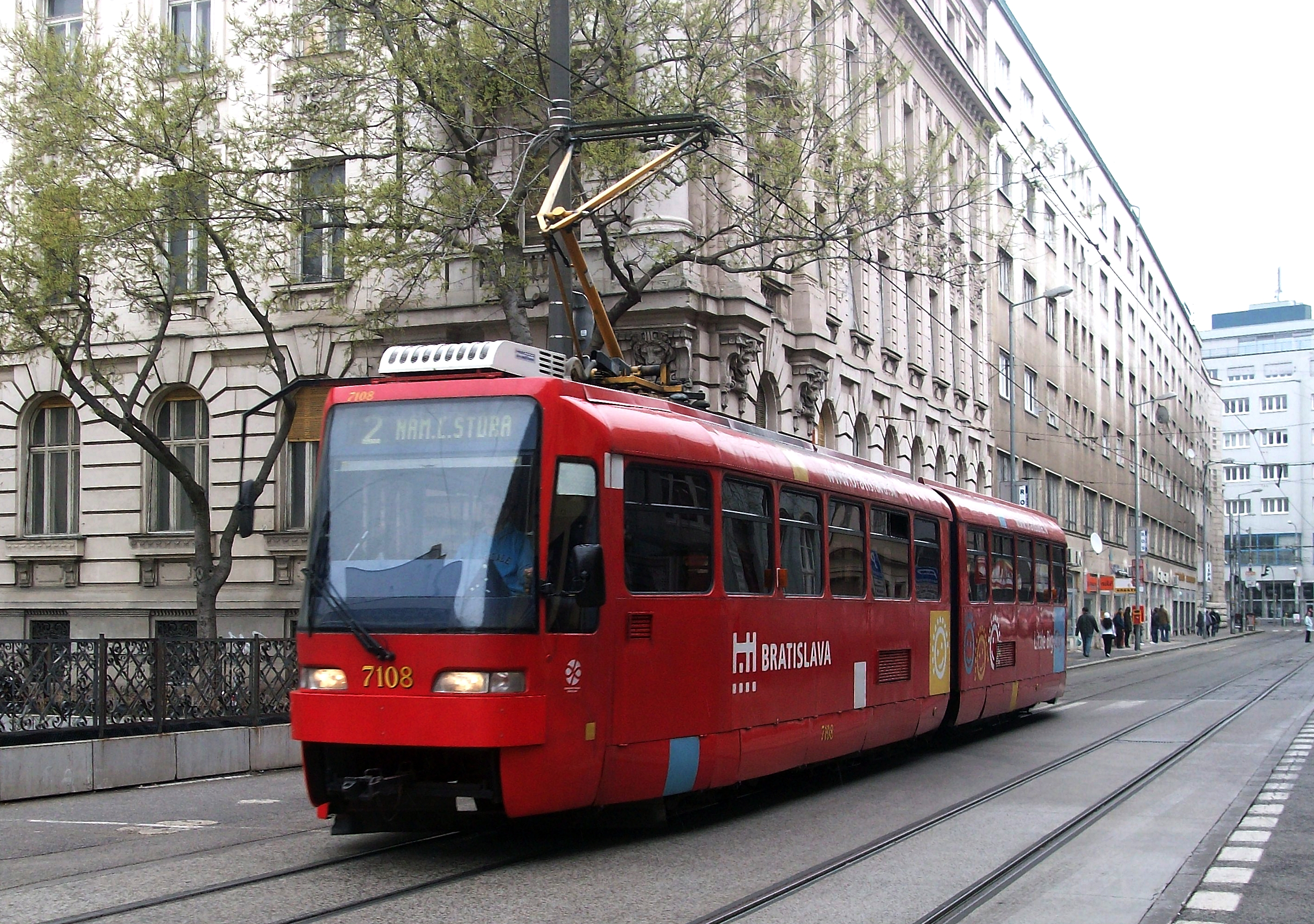
Modernized tram type K2S in Bratislava

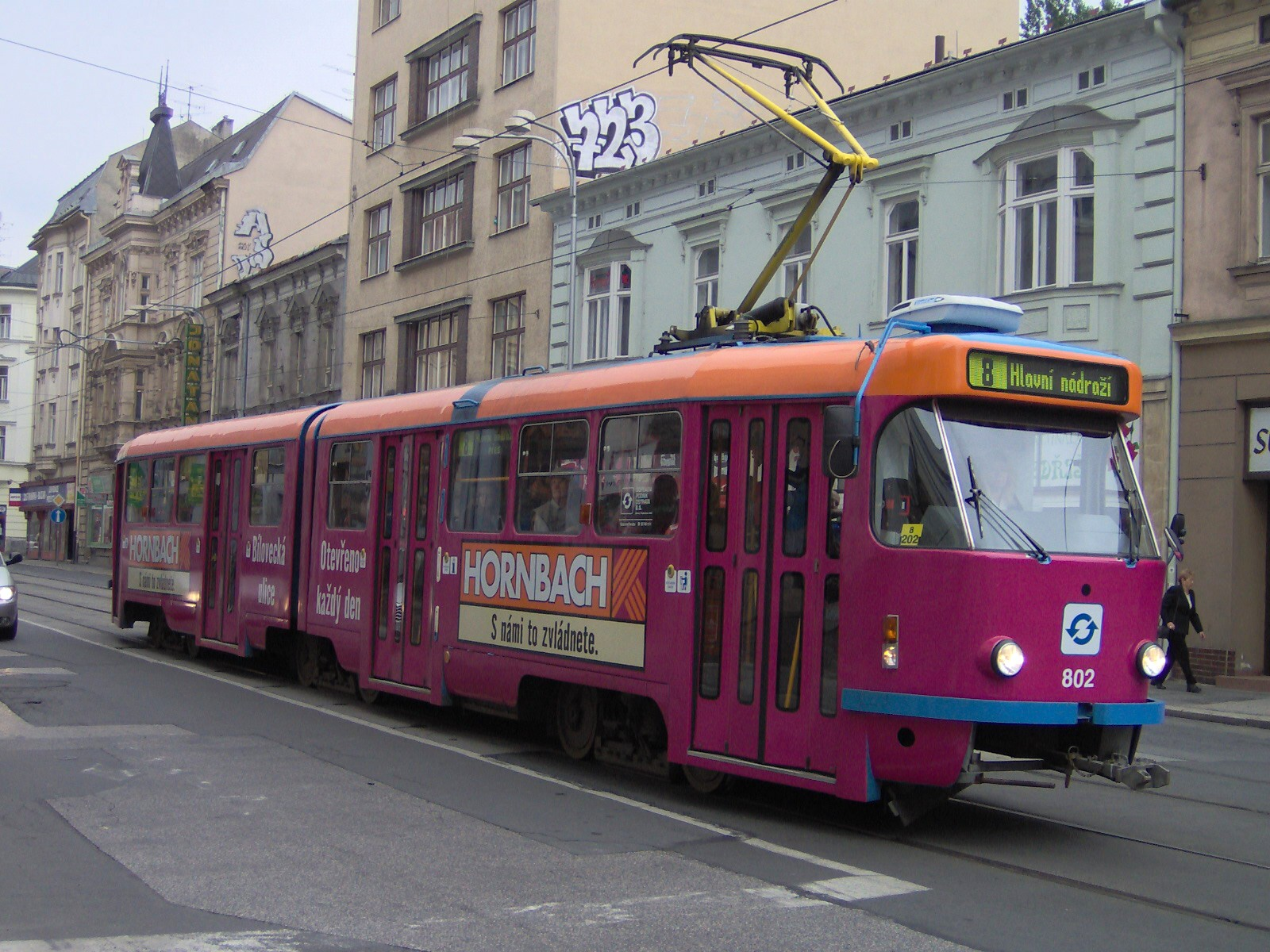
K2R.P tram in Ostrava

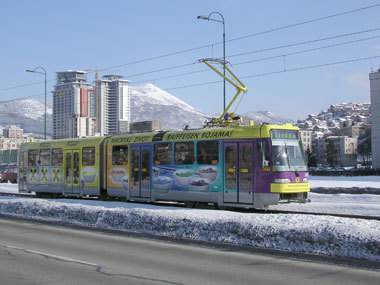
Satra II renovated by Inekon Trams
