= Pravda, Volchikhinsky District, Altai Krai =

Pravda Правда
- Settlement
- Location within Altai Krai Location within Russia
- Coordinates: 52°05′N 80°30′E
- Country: Russia
- Region: Altai Krai
- District: Volchikhinsky District
- Time zone: UTC+7:00

Pravda (Russian: Правда) is a rural locality (a settlement) in Volchikhinsky Selsoviet, Volchikhinsky District, Altai Krai, Russia. The population was 612 as of 2011. It was founded in 1921. There are 5 streets.

== Geography ==
Pravda is located 13 km northeast of Volchikha (the district's administrative centre) by road. Vostrovo is the nearest rural locality.
