= Peschanka =

Peschanka (Russian: Песчанка) is the name of several rural localities in Russia.

== Modern localities ==
- Peschanka, Arkhangelsk Oblast, a village in Koryazhemsky Selsoviet of Kotlassky District in Arkhangelsk Oblast
- Peschanka, Novooskolsky District, Belgorod Oblast, a selo in Novooskolsky District of Belgorod Oblast
- Peschanka, Starooskolsky District, Belgorod Oblast, a selo in Starooskolsky District of Belgorod Oblast
- Peschanka, Valuysky District, Belgorod Oblast, a khutor in Valuysky District of Belgorod Oblast
- Peschanka, Klintsovsky District, Bryansk Oblast, a selo in Smolevichsky Rural Administrative Okrug of Klintsovsky District in Bryansk Oblast; 52°54′N 32°12′E
- Peschanka, Pochepsky District, Bryansk Oblast, a settlement in Titovsky Rural Administrative Okrug of Pochepsky District in Bryansk Oblast; 52°52′N 33°24′E
- Peschanka, Unechsky District, Bryansk Oblast, a village in Starogutnyansky Rural Administrative Okrug of Unechsky District in Bryansk Oblast; 52°51′N 32°38′E
- Peschanka, Chelyabinsk Oblast, a settlement in Snezhnensky Selsoviet of Kartalinsky District in Chelyabinsk Oblast
- Peschanka, Belokholunitsky District, Kirov Oblast, a settlement in Klimkovsky Rural Okrug of Belokholunitsky District in Kirov Oblast; 58°55′N 51°5′E
- Peschanka, Luzsky District, Kirov Oblast, a village in Papulovsky Rural Okrug of Luzsky District in Kirov Oblast; 60°23′N 48°25′E
- Peschanka, Orichevsky District, Kirov Oblast, a village in Kuchelapovsky Rural Okrug of Orichevsky District in Kirov Oblast; 58°13′N 49°29′E
- Peschanka, Komi Republic, a village under the administrative jurisdiction of Kozhva Urban-Type Settlement Administrative Territory under the administrative jurisdiction of the town of republic significance of Pechora in the Komi Republic; 65°16′N 57°2′E
- Peschanka, Kostroma Oblast, a village in Pyshchugskoye Settlement of Pyshchugsky District in Kostroma Oblast; 58°52′N 45°51′E
- Peschanka, Krasnoyarsk Krai, a village under the administrative jurisdiction of Sovetsky City District of the krai city of Krasnoyarsk in Krasnoyarsk Krai
- Peschanka, Leningrad Oblast, a village in Koskovskoye Settlement Municipal Formation of Tikhvinsky District in Leningrad Oblast; 60°3′N 33°30′E
- Peschanka, Novgorod Oblast, a village in Borovenkovskoye Settlement of Okulovsky District in Novgorod Oblast
- Peschanka, Omsk Oblast, a village in Lukyanovsky Rural Okrug of Odessky District in Omsk Oblast
- Peschanka, Gorodishchensky District, Penza Oblast, a selo in Yulovsky Selsoviet of Gorodishchensky District in Penza Oblast
- Peschanka, Serdobsky District, Penza Oblast, a selo in Peschansky Selsoviet of Serdobsky District in Penza Oblast
- Peschanka, Shemysheysky District, Penza Oblast, a selo in Naskaftymsky Selsoviet of Shemysheysky District in Penza Oblast
- Peschanka, Perm Krai, a village in Kungursky District of Perm Krai
- Peschanka, Novorzhevsky District, Pskov Oblast, a village in Novorzhevsky District of Pskov Oblast
- Peschanka, Porkhovsky District, Pskov Oblast, a village in Porkhovsky District of Pskov Oblast
- Peschanka, Pskovsky District, Pskov Oblast, a village in Pskovsky District of Pskov Oblast
- Peschanka, Pustoshkinsky District, Pskov Oblast, a village in Pustoshkinsky District of Pskov Oblast
- Peschanka, Sebezhsky District, Pskov Oblast, a village in Sebezhsky District of Pskov Oblast
- Peschanka, Atkarsky District, Saratov Oblast, a selo in Atkarsky District of Saratov Oblast
- Peschanka, Rtishchevsky District, Saratov Oblast, a selo in Rtishchevsky District of Saratov Oblast
- Peschanka, Samoylovsky District, Saratov Oblast, a selo in Samoylovsky District of Saratov Oblast
- Peschanka, Volsky District, Saratov Oblast, a selo in Volsky District of Saratov Oblast
- Peschanka, Smolensk Oblast, a village in Ozernoye Rural Settlement of Shumyachsky District in Smolensk Oblast
- Peschanka, Likhoslavlsky District, Tver Oblast, a village in Tolmachevskoye Rural Settlement of Likhoslavlsky District in Tver Oblast
- Peschanka, Toropetsky District, Tver Oblast, a village in Pozhinskoye Rural Settlement of Toropetsky District in Tver Oblast
- Peschanka, Ilovlinsky District, Volgograd Oblast, a khutor under the administrative jurisdiction of Ilovlya Urban-Type Settlement in Ilovlinsky District of Volgograd Oblast
- Peschanka, Sredneakhtubinsky District, Volgograd Oblast, a settlement under the administrative jurisdiction of the town of district significance of Krasnoslobodsk in Sredneakhtubinsky District of Volgograd Oblast
- Peschanka, Staropoltavsky District, Volgograd Oblast, a selo in Novopoltavsky Selsoviet of Staropoltavsky District in Volgograd Oblast

== Abolished localities ==
- Peschanka, Novosibirsk Oblast, a village in Barabinsky District of Novosibirsk Oblast; abolished in June 2009
- Peschanka, Volgograd, Volgograd Oblast, a selo under the administrative jurisdiction of Gorkovsky Urban-Type Settlement under the administrative jurisdiction of Sovetsky City District in the city of oblast significance of Volgograd of Volgograd Oblast; abolished in March 2010

== Alternative names ==
- Peschanka, alternative name of Peschanoye, a selo in Linevsky Selsoviet of Smolensky District in Altai Krai; 52°24′N 84°53′E
- Peschanka, alternative name of Peschanskoye, a selo in Peschansky Selsoviet of Shchuchansky District in Kurgan Oblast; 55°41′N 62°43′E
