= Komintern, Altai Krai =

Komintern Коминтерн
- Settlement
- Location within Altai Krai Location within Russia
- Coordinates: 52°10′N 80°12′E
- Country: Russia
- Region: Altai Krai
- District: Volchikhinsky District
- Time zone: UTC+7:00

Komintern (Russian: Коминтерн) is a rural locality (a settlement) and the administrative center of Kominternovsky Selsoviet of Volchikhinsky District, Altai Krai, Russia. The population was 401 as of 2016. It was founded in 1929. There are 6 streets.

== Geography ==
Komintern is located 29 km north of Volchikha (the district's administrative centre) by road. Pyatkov Log is the nearest rural locality.
