= Komintern (rural locality) =

Komintern (Russian: Коминтерн) is the name of several rural localities in Russia:

- Komintern, Republic of Adygea, a khutor in Maykopsky District of the Republic of Adygea
- Komintern, Altai Krai, a settlement in Volchikhinsky District of Altai Krai
- Komintern, the name of several other rural localities
