= Malyshev Log =

Malyshev Log Малышев Лог
- Village
- Location within Altai Krai Location within Russia
- Coordinates: 52°09′N 80°54′E
- Country: Russia
- Region: Altai Krai
- District: Volchikhinsky District
- Time zone: UTC+7:00

Malyshev Log (Russian: Малышев Лог) is a rural locality (a selo) and the administrative center of Malyshevo-Logovsky Selsoviet of Volchikhinsky District, Altai Krai, Russia. The population was 1053 as of 2016. It was founded in 1884. There are 8 streets.

== Economy ==
The Shushtalepskaya Mine is located near the village, although the name has no relation to the other village of Shushtalep about 6–7 kilometres away. The mine was built in 1948 with labour provided by World War 2 prisoners-of-war. The increased output of the mine and its location, being on the other side of the Kondoma necessitated transport for the workers, thus a tram service was created by reusing unelectrified train tracks. Currently, the mine is mostly not functioning.

== Geography ==
Malyshev Log is located 50 km northeast of Volchikha (the district's administrative centre) by road. Solonovka is the nearest rural locality.

== Ethnicity ==
The village is inhabited by Russians and others.

== Transport ==
The village formerly had a tram line running to Kaltan from 1957 to 1961 to connect the mine with the residential areas, though it did not actually enter Kaltan, terminating on the outskirts of the town. A single MS tram delivered second hand from Prokopyevsk was used, until it deteriorated so much that the service was terminated in 1961, when new buses arrived.
