= Komintern =

Komintern may refer to:

- Comintern, a.k.a. communist International, an international communist organization that advocated world communism
- Komintern (rural locality), several rural localities in Russia
- Komintern, Kyrgyzstan, a village in Jalal-Abad Region, Kyrgyzstan
- Komintern, the name of the T-24 tank#Artillery tractors
- Soviet cruiser Komintern
- Malyshev Factory (called Kharkov Komintern Locomotive Factory in 1927–38)
