= Trams in Vladivostok =

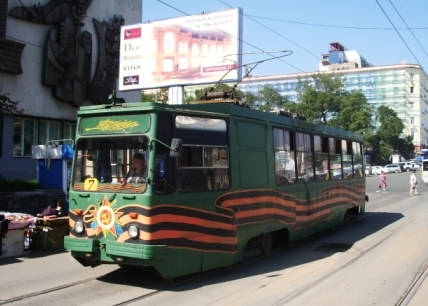

Overview
- Locale: Vladivostok, Russia
- Stations: 11

Service
- Type: Tramway
- Services: 1
- Operator: OAO «Elektricheskiy Transport»

History
- Opened: 9 October 1912
- Closed: 2010

Technical
- Line length: 5.5 km (3.4 mi)
- Num of tracks: Double track
- Track gauge: 1,524 mm (5 ft)
- Electrification: yes

The Tram in Vladivostok (Russian: Владивостокский трамвай) is a public transportation system in Vladivostok, Russia. The first section of track opened on 9 October 1912. In 1991, the total track length was 18.4 km (11.4 mi), but all lines except one entirely on reserved track alongside roads, were abandoned by 2010 due to the recession after dissolution of the Soviet Union.

== List of routes ==
6. Minnyy Gorodok – Sakhalinskaya

Tram line map (2022)

Vladivostok trams on line in 2019

== See also ==
- List of town tramway systems in Russia
