= Tatra K5 =

Tram model produced by ČKD Tatra

Tatra K5AR
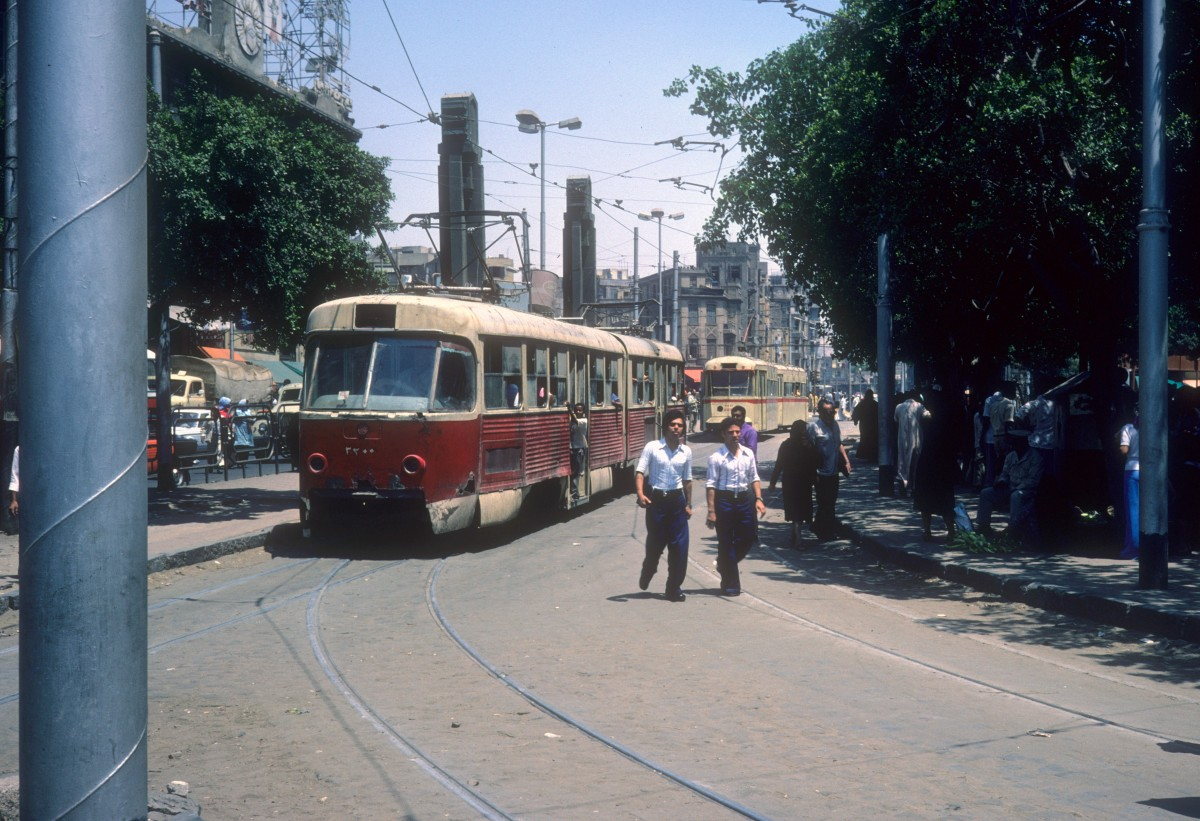
- A Tatra K5 in Cairo in 1977
- Stock type: Electric multiple unit
- Manufacturer: ČKD Tatra
- Constructed: 1970–1973
- Number built: 200
- Capacity: 56 (Seated); 92 (Standing)

Specifications
- Train length: 21.6 m (71 ft)
- Car length: 20.4 m (67 ft)
- Width: 2.5 m (8 ft 2 in)
- Height: 3.05 m (10.0 ft)
- Doors: 6
- Articulated sections: 1
- Wheelbase: 1.9 m (6 ft 3 in) (chassis)
- Power output: 4 * 44.5 kW (178 kW)

The Tatra K5 (officially the K5AR), nicknamed "Cairos", were bidirectional two-section trams manufactured by ČKD Tatra in the early 1970s. This type was derived from the uni–directional Tatra K2 variant. The K5s were supplied exclusively to the Cairo tram network, in a quantity of 200 trams. Due to persistent overloading and their deficient state, the trams remained in service for approximately one decade.

== Background ==
The delivery of Tatra K5 (officially K5AR) trams, which had been in development since the mid-1960s, to Egypt at the turn of the 1960s and 1970s was probably due to losing the Six-Day War in 1967, and the rapprochement of the Egyptian Republic with the Soviet Union and other Eastern Bloc states.

== Construction ==
The Tatra K5 was a bidirectional two-section tram based, on the earlier Tatra K2. The K5, unlike the K2, was a bidirectional tram, with driver's cabins at both ends. Its body consisted of two sections, with three double doors spread across each side of the conjoined sections. A feature of the K5 was the division of the interior into passenger classes; the first class was separated from the second class by a chain with leather upholstery. Unlike the K2, the K5 cars could be coupled in pairs; this was tested in Prague and shortly after its commissioning in Cairo, but the local operator did not use this feature.

The interior mostly used parts from the and K2 and Tatra T3. The K5s did not have heaters, conductor's stations, or sandboxes installed in the interior. The windows were adapted for the subtropical climate by having sliding upper and lower parts. The electrical equipment of the K5 was adapted for the climatic conditions of the subtropical belt. The electrical equipment was based on the electrical equipment of the K2. The electric current was taken from the overhead line by two pantographs, each of them located on the roof of a section. The trams were equipped for slow travel, reaching speeds up to 30 km/h (19 mph).

== Deliveries and operation ==
The prototype of the K5 was manufactured by ČKD Tatra in 1968. Production of the trams took place between 1970 and 1973, when all 200 units produced were delivered to Cairo at the same time. The first 150 K5s were painted green and cream, the last 50 were painted in red and cream. They were disassembled into two sections, loaded onto railway wagons, and sent to the Yugoslav port of Rijeka, from where they were taken to Egypt by ship. Cairo tram drivers were trained on K2 trams in Brno in 1969.

A large number of K5s were destroyed by fires during operation in Egypt. According to preserved photographs from 1976, the rest of the K5s were also in poor condition, as maintenance and care was not at the required level of maintenance. Czechoslovak technicians came to Cairo in 1975–1978 and began repairs on about 100 K5s. To the operator's wishes, the technicians removed all unnecessary functions, such as dismantling door controls and windscreen wipers, and mounting other pantographs on metal superstructures. The last K5s were retired in 1981 due to persistent overloading and their deficient state.
