= Valovoy Kordon =

Valovoy Kordon Валовой Кордон
- Selo
- Location within Altai Krai Location within Russia
- Coordinates: 51°46′N 80°21′E
- Country: Russia
- Region: Altai Krai
- District: Uglovsky District
- Time zone: UTC+7:00

Valovoy Kordon (Russian: Валовой Кордон) is a rural locality (a selo) in Simonovsky Selsoviet, Uglovsky District, Altai Krai, Russia. The population was 274 as of 2013. It was founded in 1898. There are 4 streets.

== Geography ==
Valovoy Kordon is located 59 km north of Uglovskoye (the district's administrative centre) by road. Ust-Kormikha is the nearest rural locality.
