= Trams in Magnitogorsk =

Tram system of the city of Magnitogorsk, Russia

Magnitogorsk tramway network
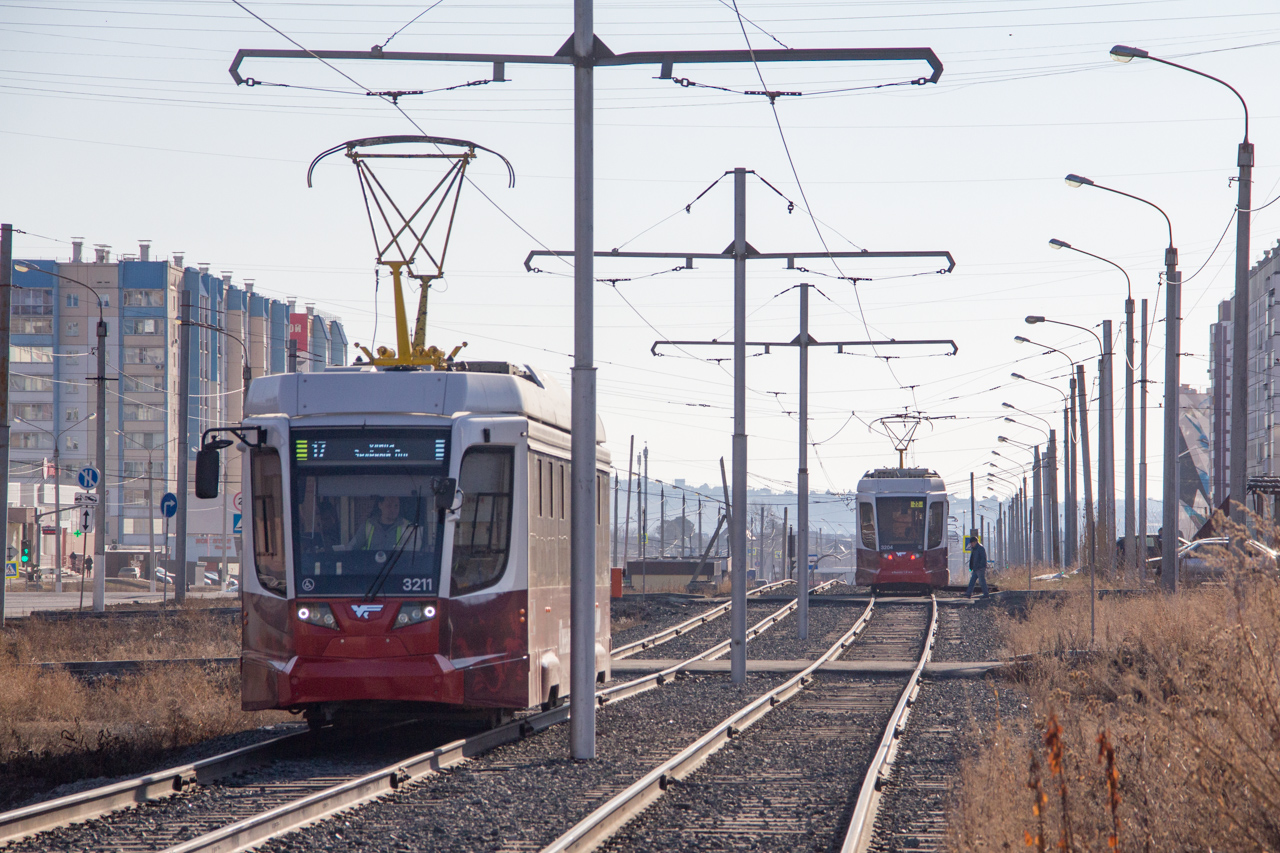

Overview
- Locale: Magnitogorsk, Russia
- Transit type: Tramway
- Annual ridership: 20.4 million (2024)
- Website: http://www.maggortrans.ru/

Technical
- System length: 170 km
- Track gauge: 5 ft (1,524 mm)
- Electrification: Overhead line (550-600 V DC)

The Magnitogorsk tramway network is a third largest tram network in Russia (after St. Petersburg and Moscow), consisting of 170 km (110 mi) of five foot gauge (1,524 mm) track.

== History ==
First trams appeared in Magnitogorsk in 1935, and throughout the Soviet period, the Magnitogorsk tram was a departmental enterprise owned by Magnitogorsk Iron and Steel Works.

In 1938, every tram stop was equipped with a metal plate to inform people about the timetable. By the end of the 1930s, the interval in the tram service had reduced from 30 to 7 min and the maximum potential speed, according to the technical documentation, had increased up to 40 km/h. However, in reality, in 1940 the tram operated at an average speed of 16.3 km/h.

During the war, the Magnitogorsk tram system was used to transport passengers, as well as to transport wounded soldiers from the front. The trams picked up the wounded at the railway station and transported them to several hospitals.

The development of the tram service recommenced in the post-war period when the layout of the city underwent drastic changes. The tram line connecting the left and right banks of the river was put into operation in 1948. The inefficiency of alternative ways of moving around the city meant that by 1950, the tram had become the main means of transportation from home to work and back.

Magnitogorsk introduced a season ticket in 1955. Later, the fare was unified, and after the 1961 monetary reform it amounted to 3 kopecks.

=== Modern era ===
In 2009, the municipal enterprise Maggortrans was established on the basis of the municipal enterprise Trust Electrotransport.

In the spring of 2019, the construction of a new tram line along Karl Marx Avenue from Truda Street to Zelenyi Log Street was started. The contractor was the municipal enterprise Magnitogorskinveststroy. Construction costs amounted to 191 million rubles.

== Routes ==
31 routes are operated; 12 of which are ring routes.

== Rolling stock ==
=== Beginnings ===
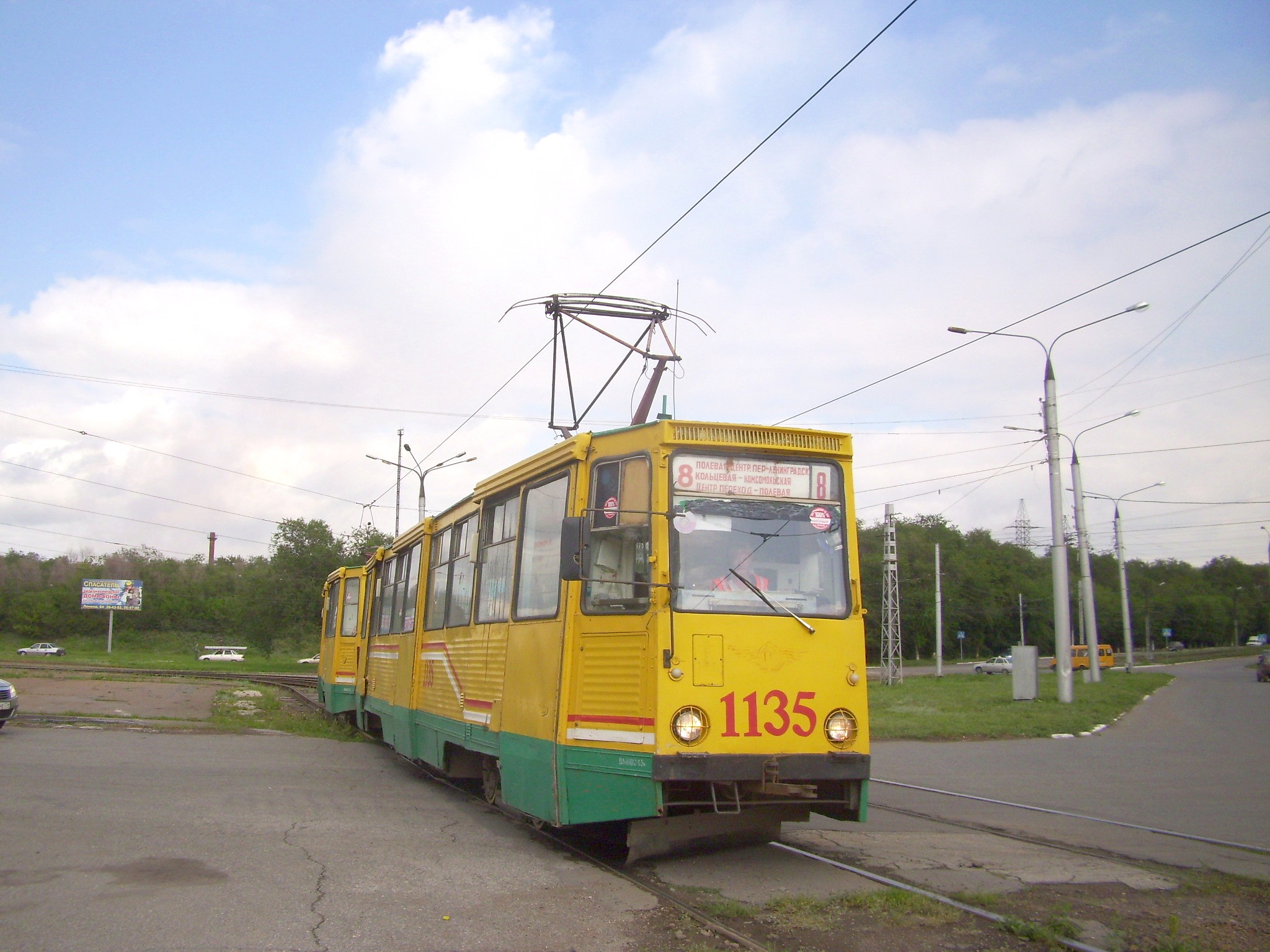
71-605 on route 8

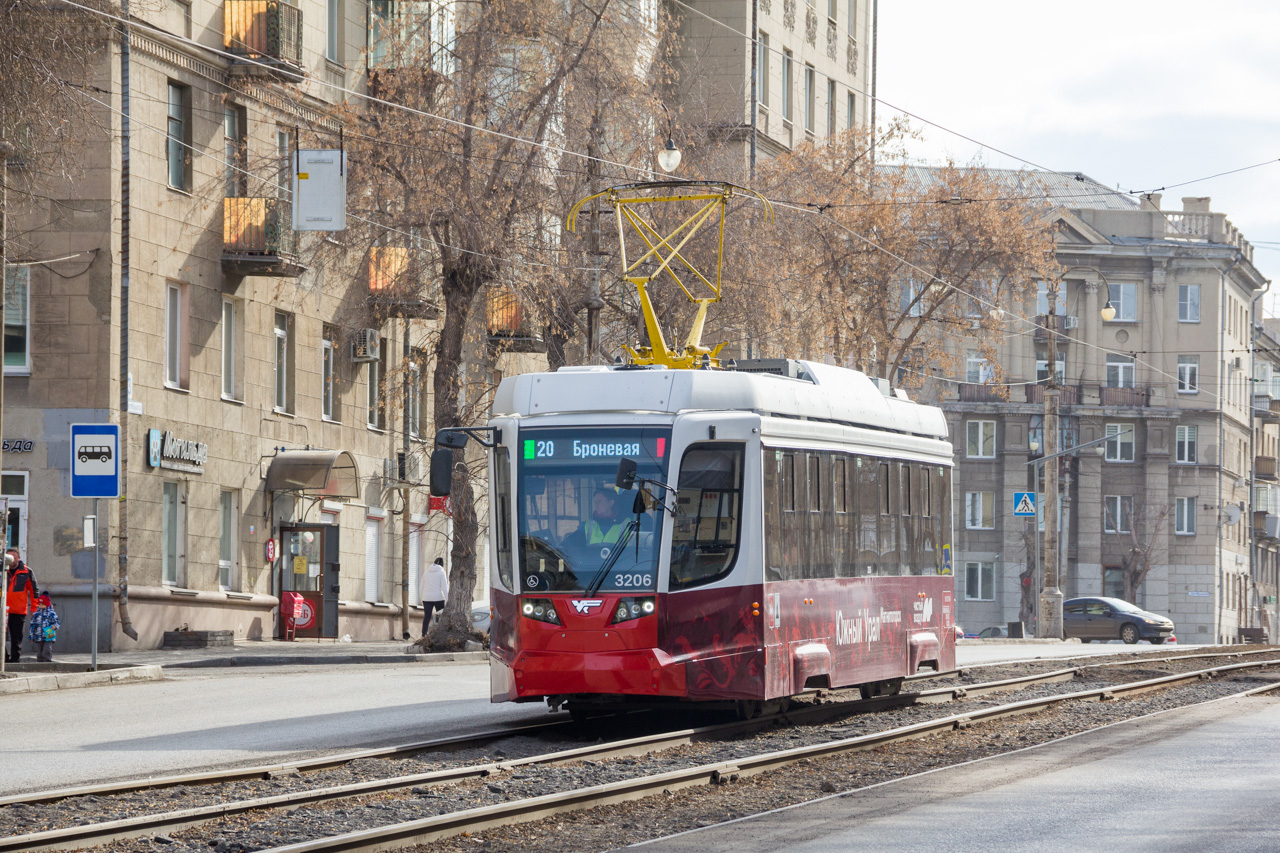
71-623-04.01 on route 20

The first tram cars which operated on the Magnitogorsk network were produced at the Mytishchi machine-building plant. The cars were of two types: series ‘X’ with motors and series ‘M’ trailers without motors. The cars of these series were reliable and quite easy to operate and maintain. However, the trailer cars shook strongly. With intensive use, cracks quickly appeared and their cantilever parts broke. In these cars, the driver worked standing, as the cab had no seat.

=== Current rolling stock ===
As of the 2026 season, 145 passenger cars are in operation in Magnitogorsk.

| Модель | Кол-во/действующих |
|---|---|
| 71-605РМ13 | 54/49 |
| 71-605А | 2/0 |
| 71-605 | 2/0 |
| 71-608КМ | 3/1 |
| 71-623-02.01 | 34/33 |
| 71-623-04.01 | 39/37 |
| 71-623-02.02 | 5/4 |
| 71-628-01 | 2/2 |
| 71-619КТ | 10/10 |
| 71-619К | 1/0 |
