= Kommunalny Bridge, Novosibirsk =

Kommunalny Bridge
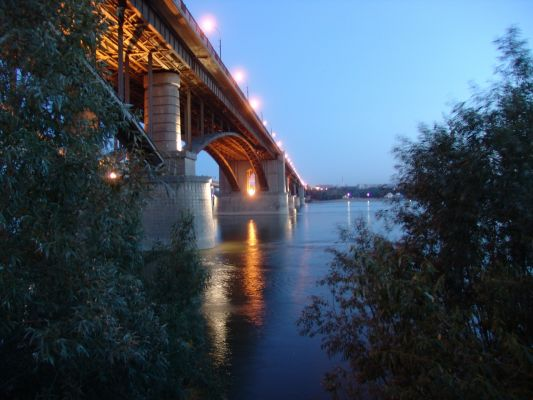
- Coordinates: 55°00′17″N 82°55′50″E
- Crosses: Ob River
- Locale: Novosibirsk, Russia

Characteristics
- Total length: 896 m
- Width: 24 m
- Longest span: 127 m

History
- Opened: 1955

The Kommunalny Bridge or The Oktyabrsky Bridge (Russian: Коммунальный мост, Kommunalny Most) is an automobile bridge over the Ob River, connecting the Kirovsky, Leninsky and Oktyabrsky districts of Novosibirsk, Russia.

== History ==
Kommunlny Bridge was opened on October 20, 1955. The cost of construction amounted to 128 million rubles.
