= Peschanka, Starooskolsky District, Belgorod Oblast =

Peschanka Песчанка
- Selo
- Location within Belgorod Oblast Location within Russia
- Coordinates: 51°18′N 37°43′E
- Country: Russia
- Region: Belgorod Oblast
- District: Starooskolsky District
- Time zone: UTC+3:00

Peschanka (Russian: Песчанка) is a rural locality (a selo) and the administrative center of Peschanskoye Rural Settlement, Starooskolsky District, Belgorod Oblast, Russia. The population was 2,149 as of 2010. There are 36 streets.

== Geography ==
Peschanka is located 9 km west of Stary Oskol (the district's administrative centre) by road. Yezdotsky is the nearest rural locality.
