= Peschanka, Staropoltavsky District, Volgograd Oblast =

Peschanka Песчанка
- Selo
- Location within Volgograd Oblast Location within Russia
- Coordinates: 50°24′N 46°27′E
- Country: Russia
- Region: Volgograd Oblast
- District: Staropoltavsky District
- Time zone: UTC+4:00

Peschanka (Russian: Песчанка) is a rural locality (a selo) in Novopoltavskoye Rural Settlement, Staropoltavsky District, Volgograd Oblast, Russia. The population was 146 as of 2010. There are 3 streets.

== Geography ==
Peschanka is located on the right bank of the Yeruslan River, 16 km south of Staraya Poltavka (the district's administrative centre) by road. Novaya Poltavka is the nearest rural locality.
