= Trams in Novosibirsk =

Transport system in Novosibirsk, Russia

Novosibirsk tramway network
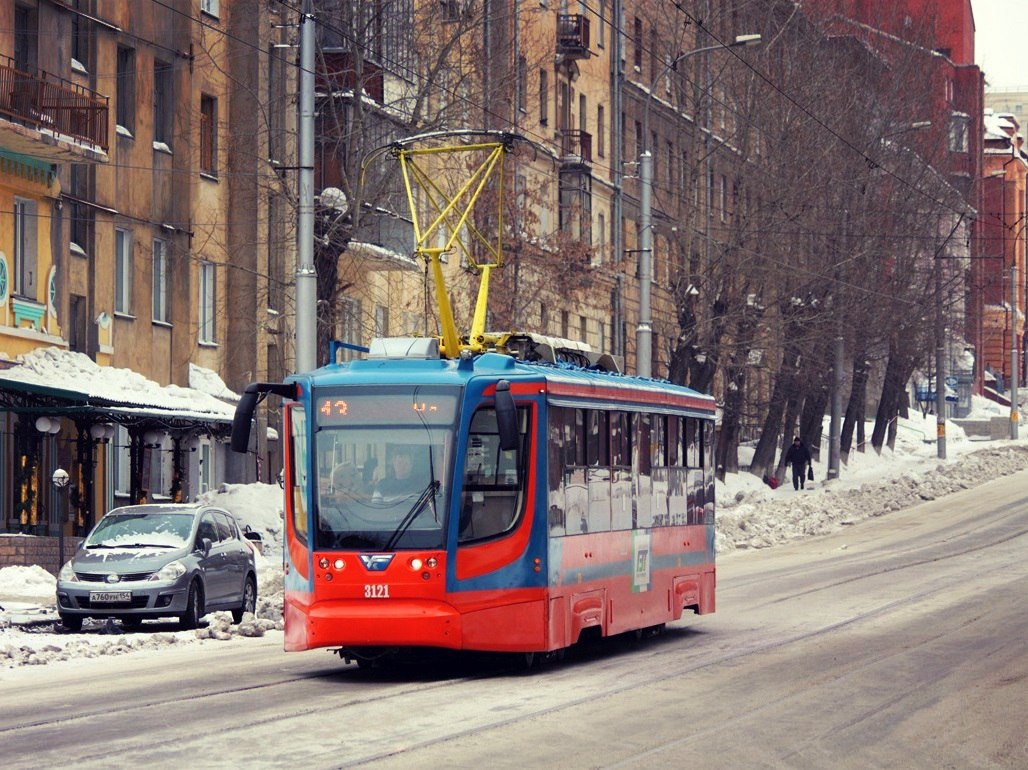

Operation
- Locale: Novosibirsk, Russia
- Open: November 26, 1934

Infrastructure
- Track gauge: 1,520 mm (4 ft 11 27/32 in)
- Depot: 2

The Novosibirsk tramway (Russian: Новосибирский трамвай) is a transport system in Novosibirsk, Russia. It was opened on November 26, 1934. In 2011, passenger traffic of Novosibirsk tramway was 19.7 million. The total length of the tram network is 152.8 km. The network has 10 routes.

== History ==
Novosibirsk tramway network (2018)

In June 1933, the construction of the first line began.

The opening of the first line took place on the morning of November 26, 1934.

The maximum length of the tram tracks was reached in 1987 – 191.4 km. There has been no tram connection across the Ob since 1992, when tram tracks on the Kommunalny Bridge were dismantled (there was the same situation in the period 1940-1955 before the opening of the Kommunalny Bridge).

The total number of passengers carried by the tram network has reached 11 million.

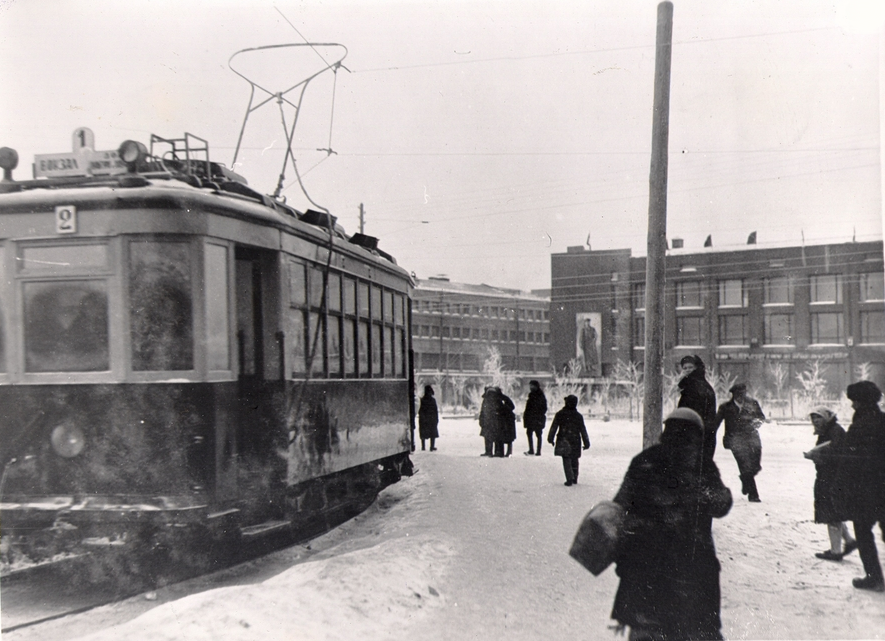
Novosibirsk Tram in 1934, the corner of Krasny Avenue and Semipalatinskaya Street

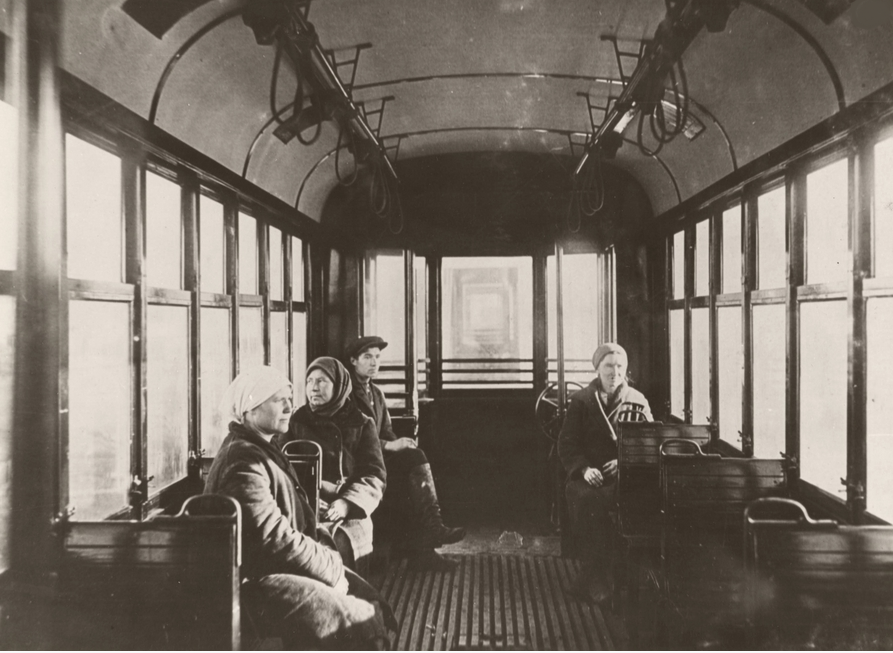
Novosibirsk Tram in 1935

== Current status ==
The system consists of 10 routes: 6 of them are situated in left-bank part of the city (№№ 3, 8, 9, 10, 15, 18), 4 of them are situated in right-bank of the city (№№ 5, 11, 13, 14).

The tram fleet is represented by such models as Soviet KTM-5, and 71-608, Russian LM99, 71-619, and 71-623, Belarusian AKSM-60102, and AKSM-62103, Czech Tatra KT4.

== Gallery ==
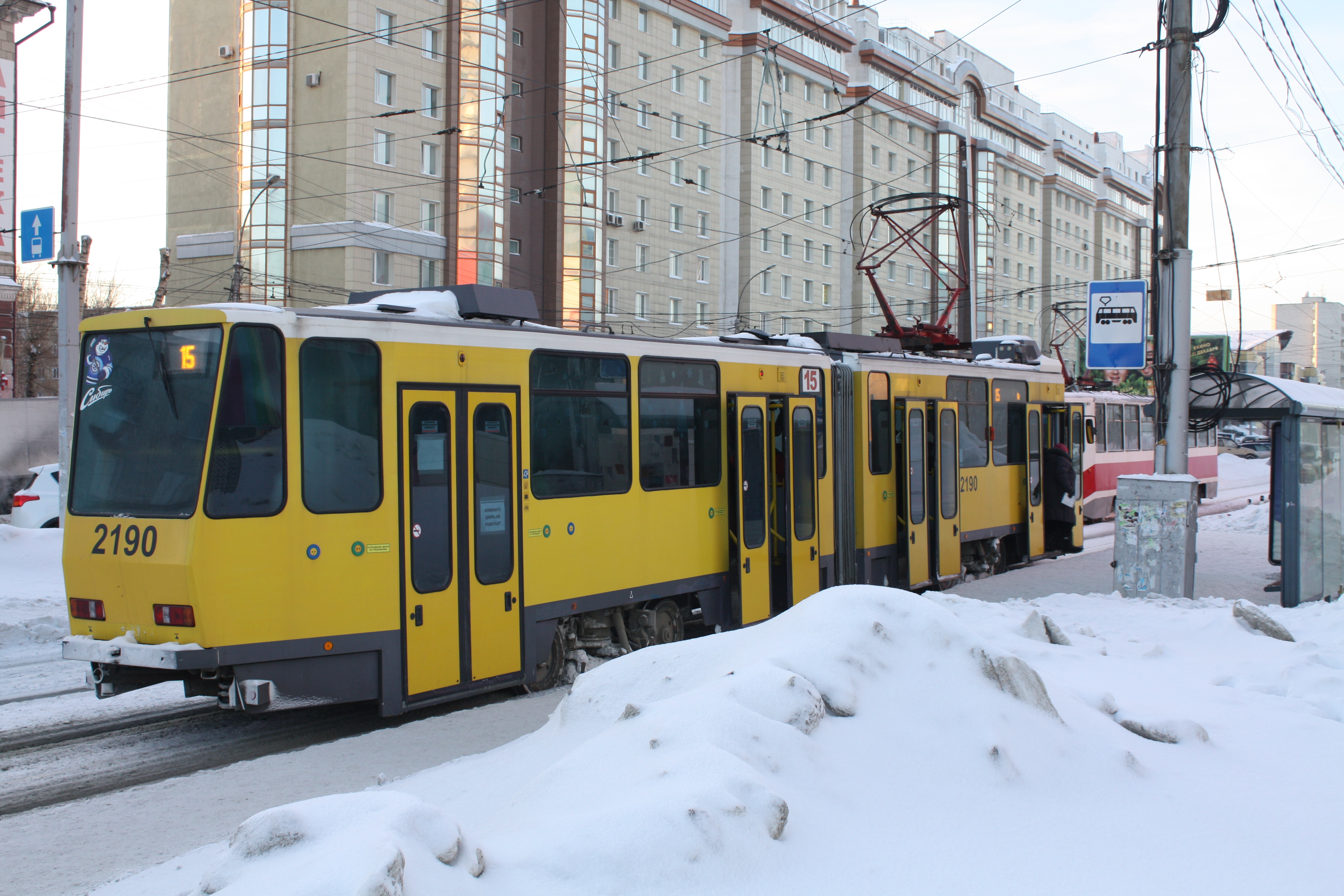

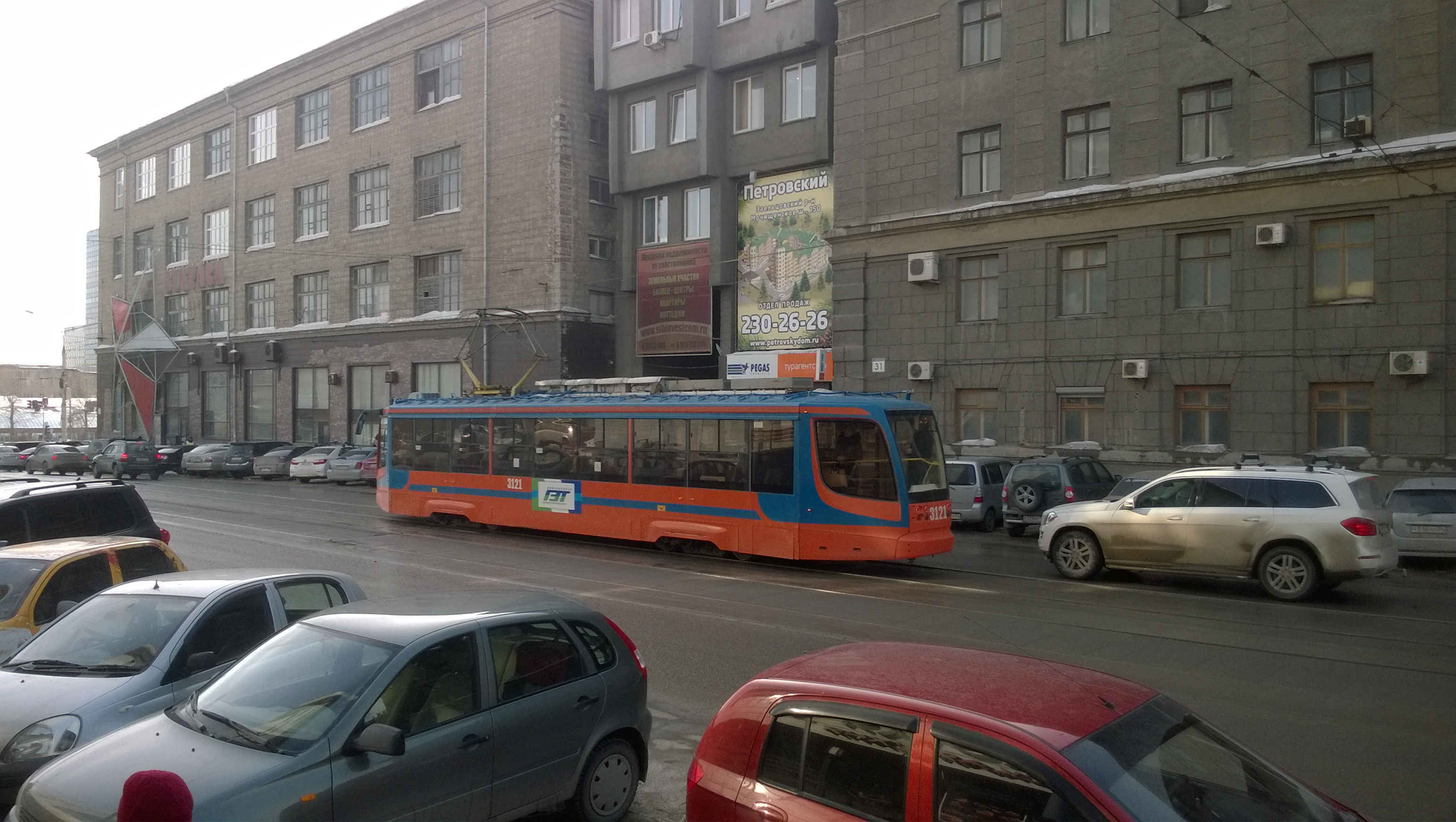

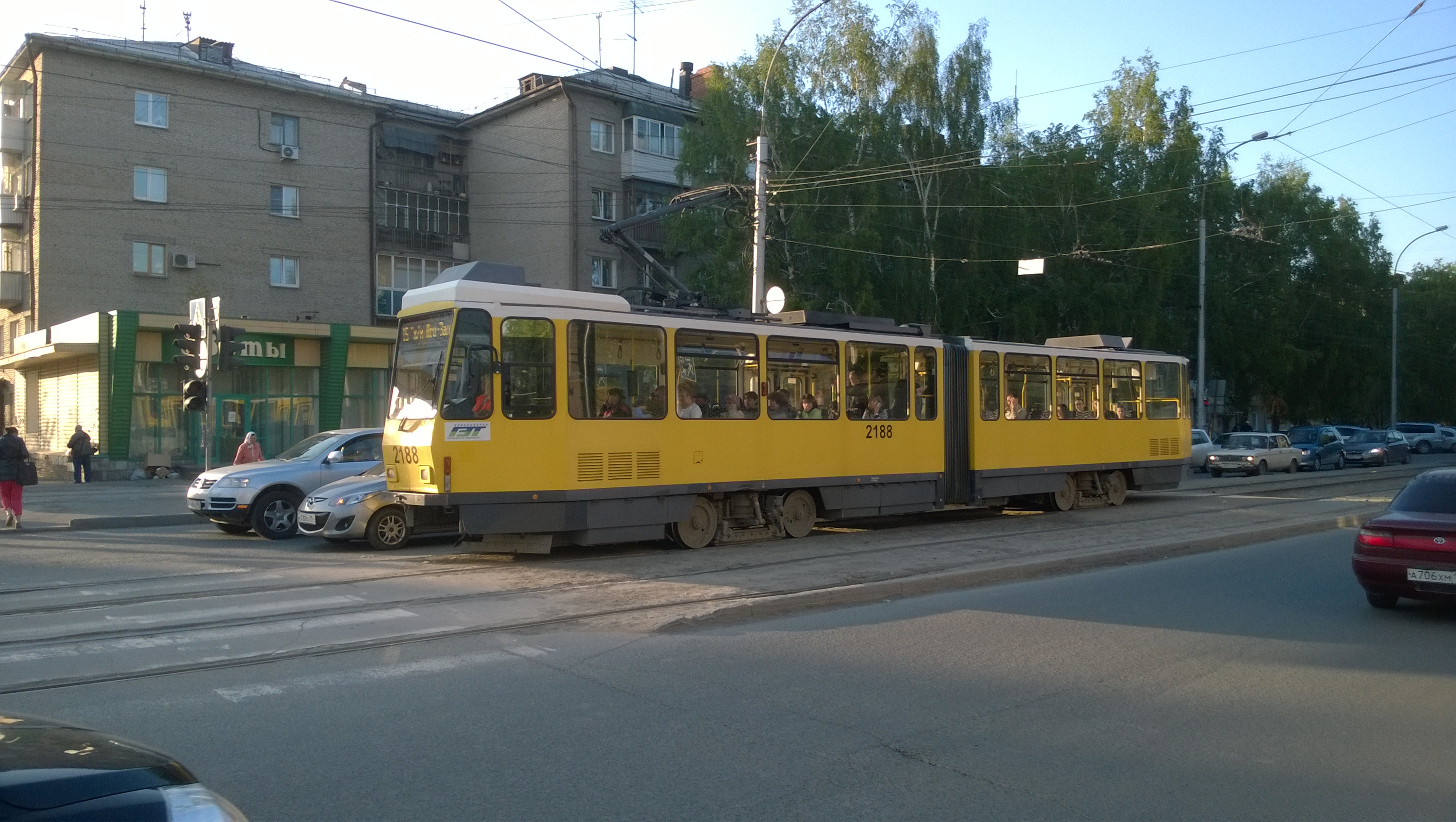

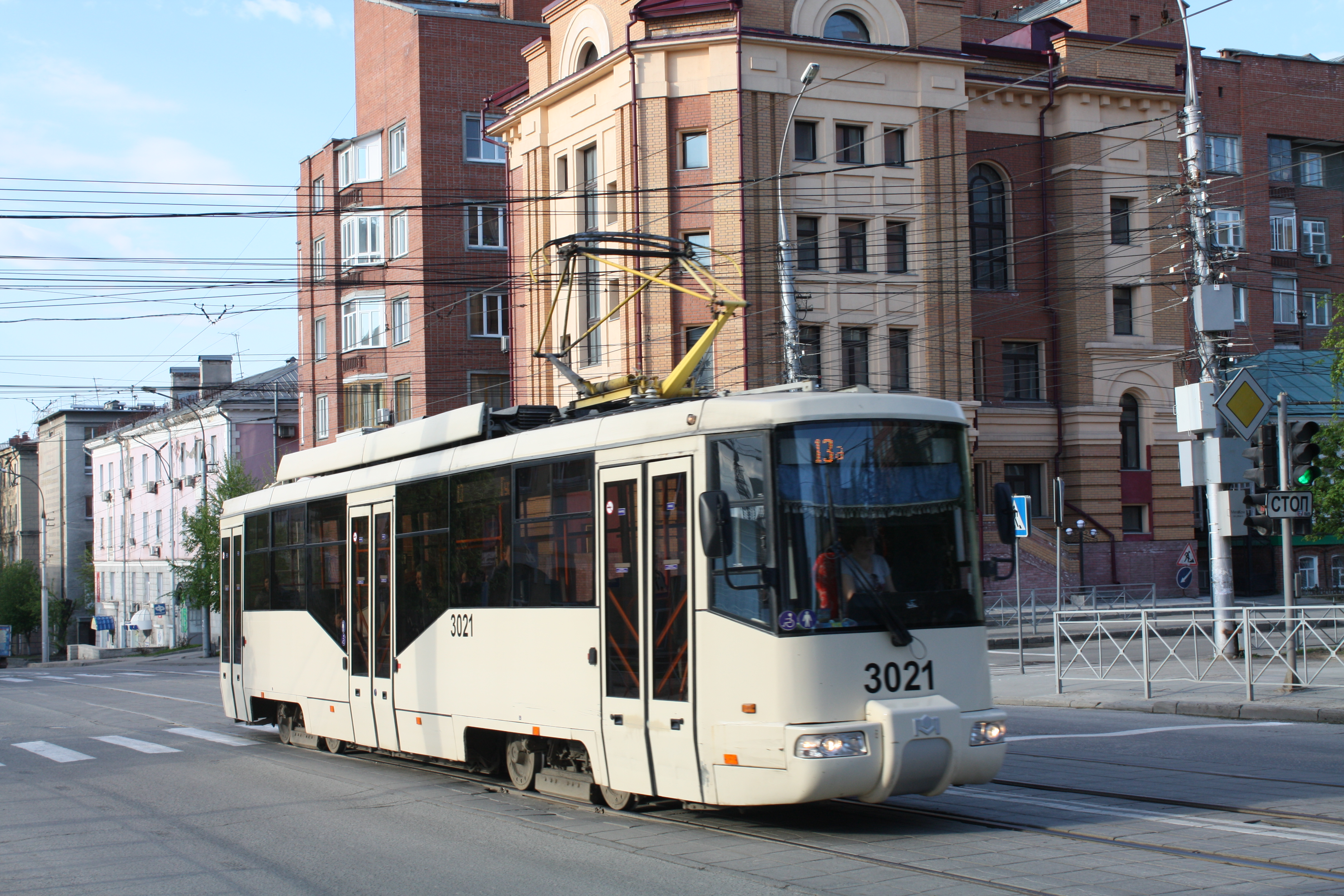

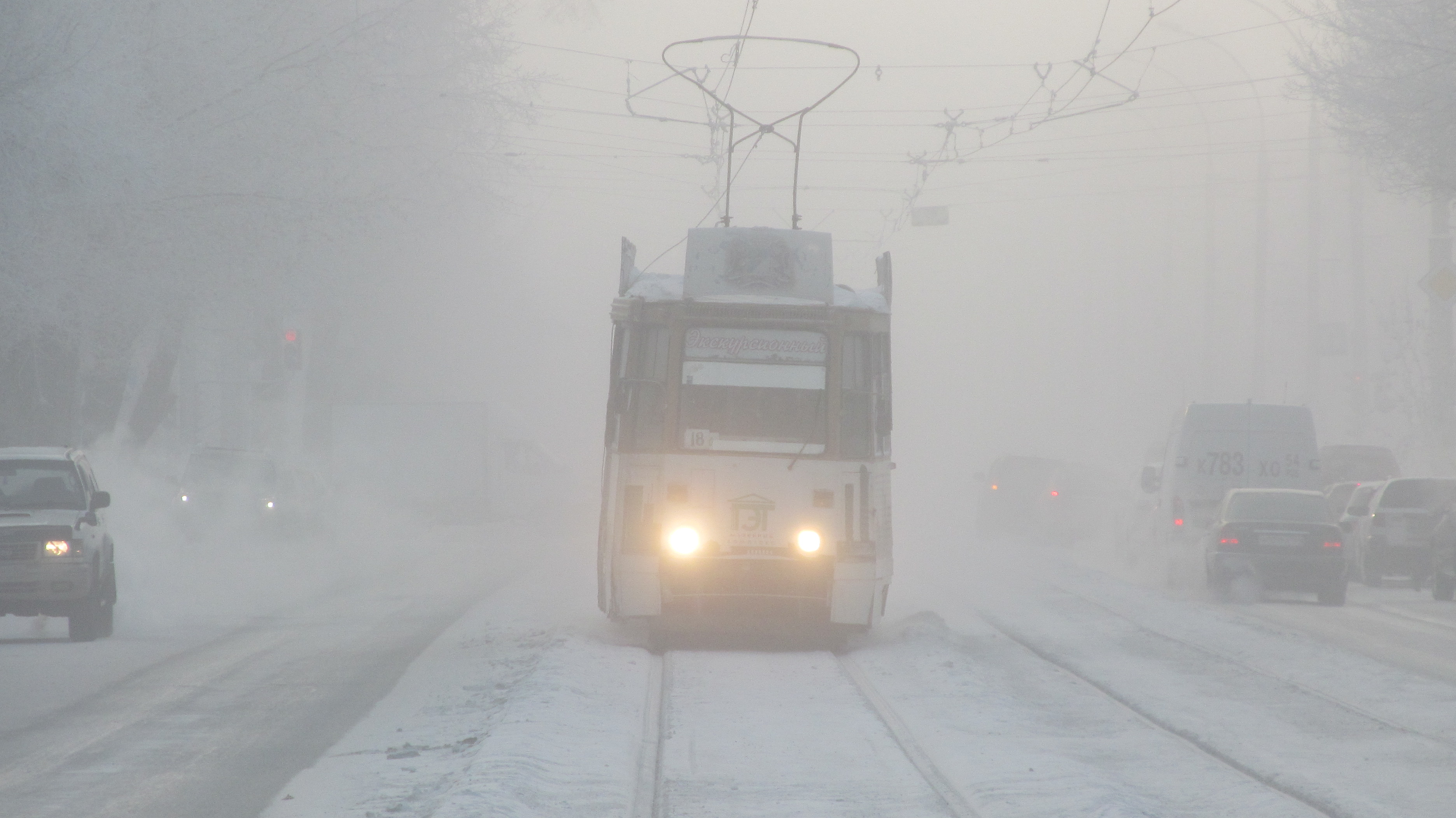

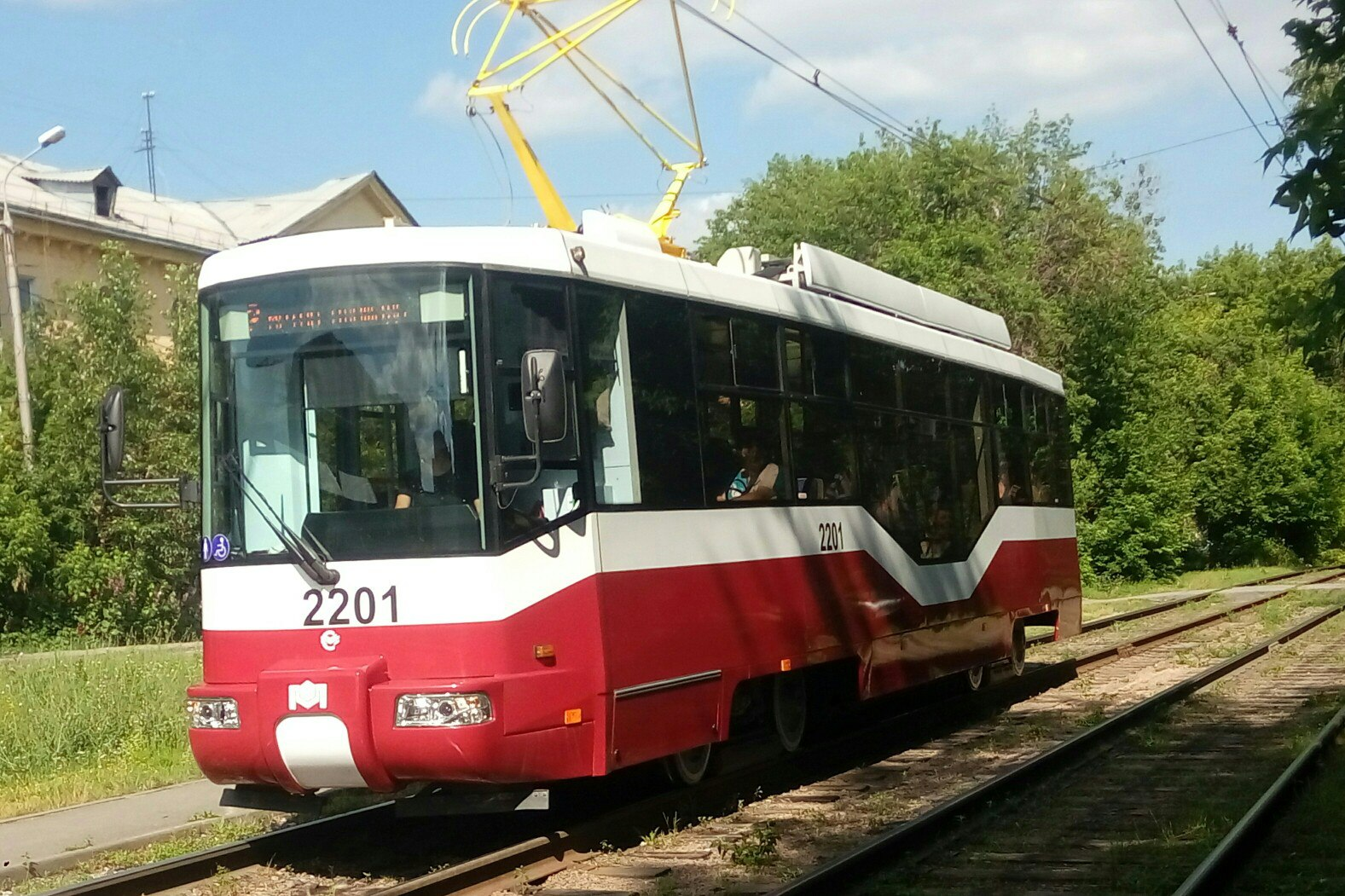
