= Trams in Barnaul =

Barnaul Tram Network
- Барнаульский трамвай
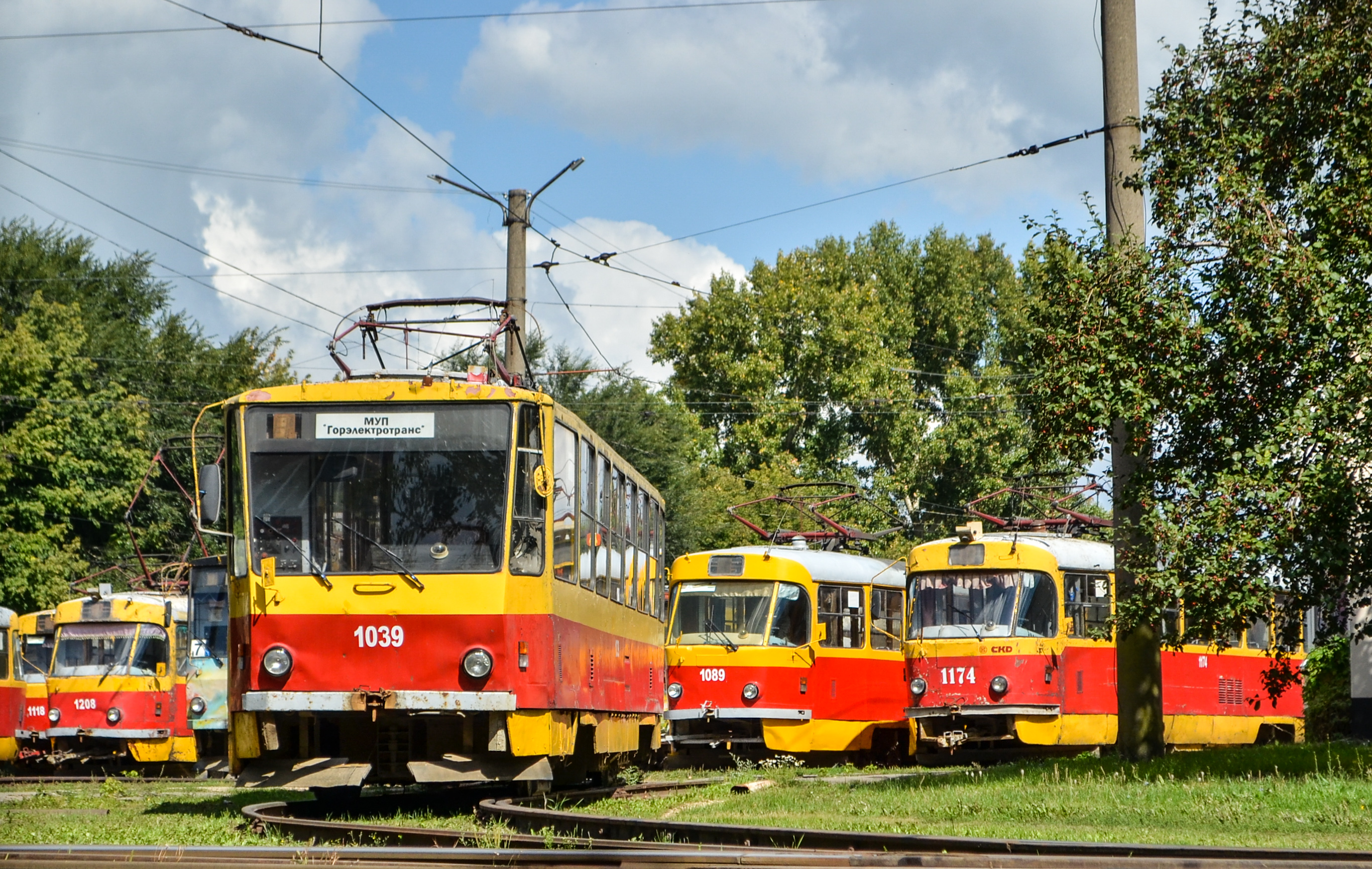

Operation
- Locale: Barnaul, Russia
- Open: 7 November 1948
- Status: Operational
- Lines: 8

Infrastructure
- Track gauge: 1,524 mm (5 ft)
- Propulsion system: Electricity
- Electrification: Overhead line, 600 V DC
- Depot: 2

The Barnaul tramway network (Russian: Барнаульский трамвай) is a tram system in the city of Barnaul in the Altai Krai. It was launched into operation on 7 November 1948. As of 2022, there are 8 tram routes in Barnaul, the total length of tracks is 125 km.

The daily transportation volume is about 250 thousand passengers. The fare from 1 May 2024 is 35 rubles (29 rubles via the electronic payment system). The main brand of rolling stock is cars manufactured by the Czech ČKD. As of February 2022, partial modernization of Tatra T3 cars is underway.
