= Trams in Ufa =

Ufa Tram Network
- Уфимский трамвай
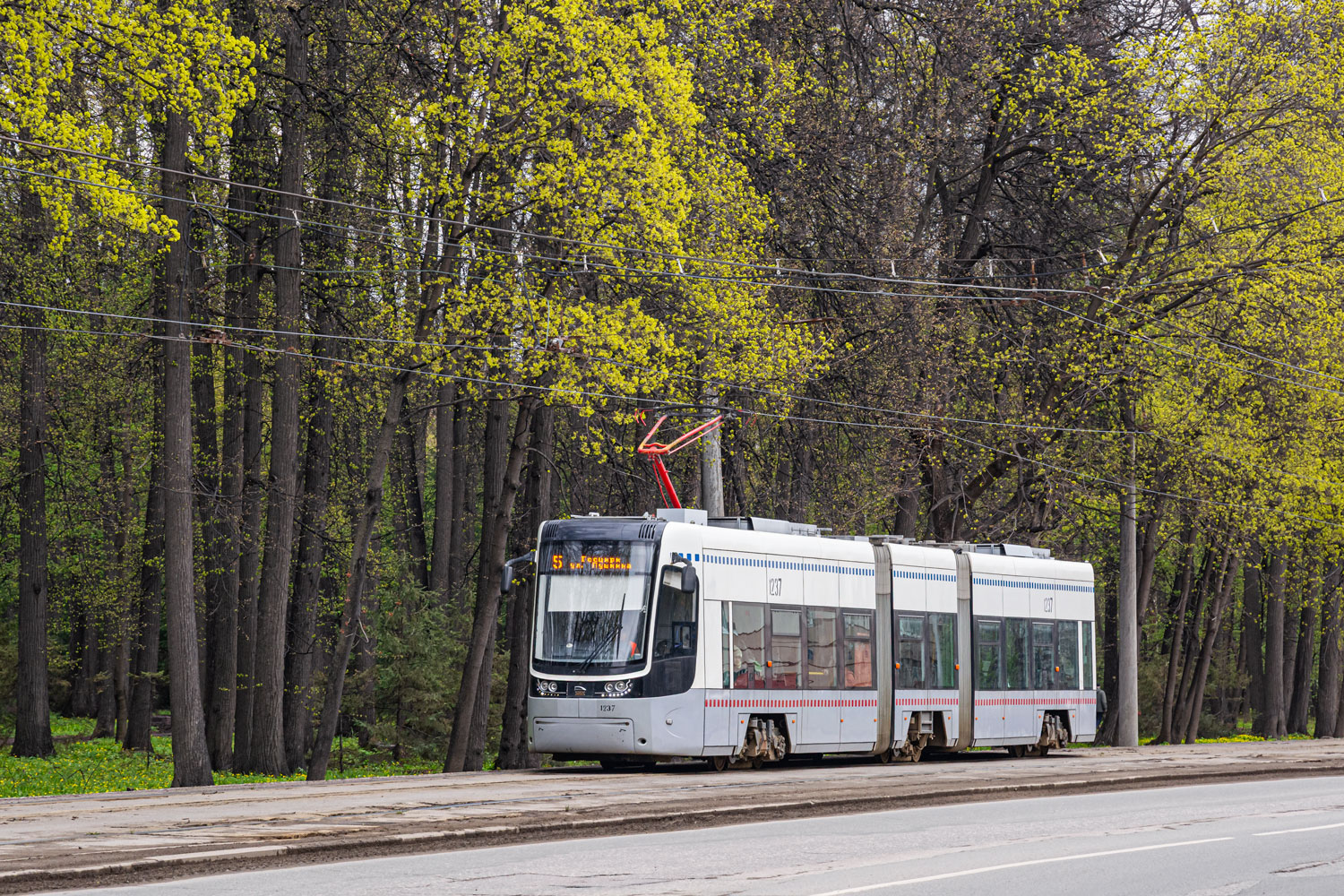

Operation
- Locale: Ufa, Russia
- Open: 1 February 1937
- Status: Operational
- Lines: 7

Infrastructure
- Track gauge: 1,524 mm (5 ft)
- Propulsion system: Electricity
- Electrification: Overhead line, 600 V DC
- Depot: 2

The Ufa tramway network (Russian: Уфимский трамвай) is a tram system in the city of Ufa in the Bashkortostan, Russia. Opened on 1 February 1937, and the historical city of Chernikovsk (Chernikovka), the two systems of which were united in 1958 and disconnected back in 2008.
