= Volchikha, Altai Krai =

Rural locality in Russia

Volchikha Волчиха
- Selo
- Interactive map of Volchikha
- Location of Volchikha Volchikha (Altai Krai)
- Coordinates: 52°00′47″N 80°21′32″E
- Country: Russia
- Federal subject: Altai Krai
- Administrative district: Volchikhinsky District
- SelsovietSelsoviet: Volchikhinsky Selsoviet
- Founded: 1782

Population (2010 Census)
  - Total: 10,396
  - Estimate (2021): 8,470 (−18.5%)

Administrative status
  - Capital of: Volchikhinsky District, Volchikhinsky Selsoviet

Municipal status
  - Municipal district: Volchikhinsky Municipal District
  - Rural settlement: Volchikhinsky Selsoviet Rural Settlement
  - Capital of: Volchikhinsky Municipal District, Volchikhinsky Selsoviet Rural Settlement
- Time zone: UTC+7 (MSK+4)
- Postal code: 658930–658933
- OKTMO ID: 01608421101

Volchikha (Russian: Волчиха) is a rural locality (a selo) and the administrative center of Volchikhinsky District of Altai Krai, Russia. Population: 10,396 (2010 census); 11,301 (2002 census); 10,420 (1989 Soviet census).
