= Volchikhinsky District =

Volchikhinsky District Волчихинский район (Russian)
- District
- Location of Volchikhinsky District in Altai Krai
- Coordinates: 52°01′N 80°22′E
- Country: Russia
- Federal subject: Altai Krai
- Established: September 24, 1924 (first), January 14, 1965 (second)
- Administrative center: Volchikha

Area
  - Total: 3,593.7 km^{2} (1,387.5 sq mi)

Population (2010 Census)
  - Total: 19,703
  - Density: 5.4827/km^{2} (14.200/sq mi)
  - Urban: 0%
  - Rural: 100%

Administrative structure
  - Administrative divisions: 11 Selsoviets
  - Inhabited localities: 15 rural localities

Municipal structure
  - Municipally incorporated as: Volchikhinsky Municipal District
  - Municipal divisions: 0 urban settlements, 11 rural settlements
- Time zone: UTC+7 (MSK+4)
- OKTMO ID: 01608000
- Website: http://www.volchiha22.ru

Population of Volchikhinsky District
- 2010 Census: 19,703
- 2002 Census: 22,345
- 1989 Census: 22,034
- 1979 Census: 23,282

Volchikhinsky District (Russian: Волчихи́нский райо́н) is an administrative and municipal district (raion), one of the fifty-nine in Altai Krai, Russia. It is located in the southwest of the krai. The area of the district is 3,593.7 square kilometers (1,387.5 sq mi). Its administrative center is the rural locality (a selo) of Volchikha. As of the 2010 Census, the total population of the district was 19,703, with the population of Volchikha accounting for 52.8% of that number.

== History ==
The district was established on September 24, 1924 within Omsk Governorate and existed until February 1, 1963. It was re-established on January 14, 1965.
