= Aquilegia aradanica =

Scientific classification
- Kingdom: Plantae
- Clade: Tracheophytes
- Clade: Angiosperms
- Clade: Eudicots
- Order: Ranunculales
- Family: Ranunculaceae
- Genus: Aquilegia
- Species: A. aradanica

Binomial name
- Aquilegia aradanica Shaulo & Erst

Species of flowering plant

Aquilegia aradanica is a perennial flowering plant in the family Ranunculaceae, endemic to Siberia.

== Description ==
Aquilegia aradanica is a perennial herb growing to 30 to 60 cm (12 to 24 in) tall. The stems are red, branched towards the top, and covered with glandular hairs. The leaves are 11–32 cm (4.3–12.6 in) long, ternate or biternate, and smooth on the surface with solitary long hairs along the edge. The leaf stalks are reddish and measure 8–24 cm (3.1–9.4 in). The plant produces nodding flowers measuring 2.5–3 cm (1.0–1.2 in) in length and diameter, also covered in glandular hairs. The sepals are blue-violet and the petals blue-violet fading to white at the tips, both 1–1.5 cm (0.4–0.6 in) long. The petals have nectar spurs of 1–1.5 cm (0.4–0.6 in) length with curved tips. The stamens extend past the petals by about 5 mm.

== Taxonomy ==
The first specimens of Aquilegia aradanica were collected in the 1960s on the Aradansky Ridge in the Western Sayan Mountains by the Russian botanist Ivan M. Krasnoborov (1931–2011). It was described as a new species from herbarium specimens by Dmitri N. Shaulo and Andrey S. Erst of the Central Siberian Botanic Garden in 2011.

Shaulo and Erst noted in their description that the plant was likely to be closely related to Aquilegia viridiflora, Aquilegia canadensis, and Aquilegia turczaninovii, and to have diverged as a species in the Pliocene. They also posited a possible ancient hybrid origin for the species, making the establishment of ancestral forms unlikely. A modern hybrid origin is not considered possible because of the probable role played by different pollinators in establishing reproductive isolation between this species and the sympatric Aquilegia glandulosa. Whether this factor also plays a major role in reproductive isolation between this species and Aquilegia borodinii, Aquilegia turczaninovii, and Aquilegia sibirica is still unknown.

=== Etymology ===
The specific epithet aradanica is taken from the Aradansky Ridge where the plant was discovered.

== Distribution and habitat ==
Aquilegia aradanica is endemic to the valleys of the Us River and Great Yenisey river in the Western Sayan Mountains in Krasnoyarsk Krai and Tuva in southern Siberia. Its habitat is in rubble screes with acidic rocky substrates (granitoids) in the forest-steppe and forest belts, not penetrating into other types of habitats at all. It grows in association with the shrubs Ribes altissimum (tall currant), Rhododendron dauricum, Rubus idaeus (raspberry), and Rosa oxyacantha, and green mosses.

== Ecology ==
Aquilegia aradanica flowers and bears fruit from June to August, and is pollinated by bumblebees of the genus Bombus.

== Conservation ==
As of November 2024, the species has not been assessed for the IUCN Red List.
