= Aquilegia kamelinii =

Scientific classification
- Kingdom: Plantae
- Clade: Tracheophytes
- Clade: Angiosperms
- Clade: Eudicots
- Order: Ranunculales
- Family: Ranunculaceae
- Genus: Aquilegia
- Species: A. kamelinii

Binomial name
- Aquilegia kamelinii Erst, Shaulo & Shmakov

Species of flowering plant

Aquilegia kamelinii is a perennial flowering plant in the family Ranunculaceae, native to northeastern China and the Russian Far East.

== Description ==
Aquilegia kamelinii is a perennial herbaceous plant growing to 25–40 cm (10–16 in). The stems are erect, branched at the top, and smooth or covered with simple and glandular hairs, with the remains of previous years' leaves at the base. The basal leaves are 12–20 cm (4.7–7.9 in) long, smooth, and ternate or biternate, with downy stalks measuring 6–15 cm (2.4–5.9 in). The leaflets are egg-shaped and slightly pointed, with 2–7 rounded teeth along the edge. The flowers are drooping, covered with downy hairs, and measure 3–3.5 cm (1.2–1.4 in) long by 2.5–4 cm (1.0–1.6 in) across. The sepals are oval, 1.5–2.5 cm (0.6–1.0 in) long, and blue or lilac-blue. The petals are purple or lilac-blue and 2–2.5 cm (0.8–1.0 in) long, with thin, truncated nectar spurs measuring 1–1.5 cm (0.4–0.6 in) in length. The stamens extend beyond the petals and are 3–5 mm long.

== Taxonomy ==
Aquilegia kamelinii was formally described by the Russian botanists Andrey S. Erst, Dmitry N. Shaulo, and Alexander I. Shmakov in 2013, from a type specimen collected on 4 July 1981 from rocks on the bank of the Amur River near Ignashino, Skovorodinsky District, Amur Oblast, on the Russian border with China. It is a stable species of hybrid origin, intermediate between Aquilegia viridiflora, Aquilegia borodinii, and Aquilegia turczaninowii. It is also closely related to Aquilegia hebeica. However, there is some doubt that molecular evidence supports its classification as a separate species rather than as a part of the A. viridiflora species complex.

=== Etymology ===
The specific epithet kamelinii honours the Russian botanist Rudolf Kamelin, for his contributions to botanical genetics, taxonomy, and other areas of botanical science.

== Distribution and habitat ==
Aquilegia kamelinii grows on rocky outcrops along the banks of the stretch of the Amur River that forms the border between Amur Oblast in Russia and Heilongjiang Province in China. There is also a specimen, collected in 1930 and later identified as A. kamelinii, from Acheng, Harbin, further south in Heilongjiang.

== Conservation ==
As of January 2025, the species has not been assessed for the IUCN Red List.
