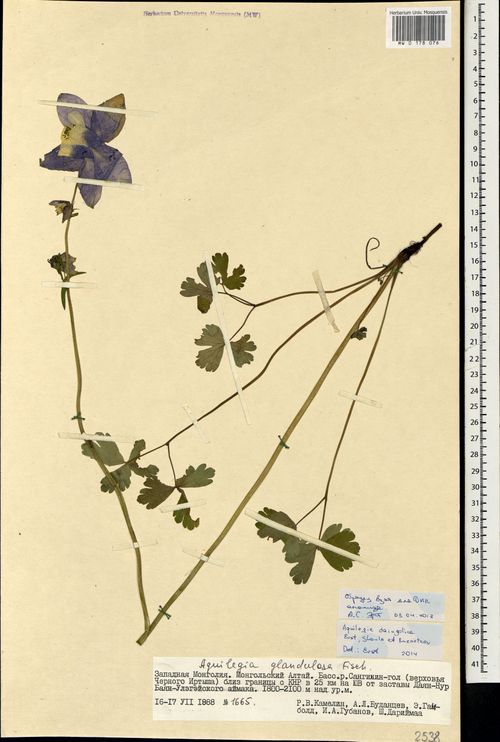
- Preserved specimen in Moscow State University

Scientific classification
- Kingdom: Plantae
- Clade: Tracheophytes
- Clade: Angiosperms
- Clade: Eudicots
- Order: Ranunculales
- Family: Ranunculaceae
- Genus: Aquilegia
- Species: A. daingolica

Binomial name
- Aquilegia daingolica Erst & Shaulo

= Aquilegia daingolica =

Asian species of columbine

Aquilegia daingolica is a perennial flowering plant in the family Ranunculaceae, endemic to Mongolia. The plant's flowers are blue or violet-blue.

The species was first described in 2013, with a paratype collected in 1906 and its type specimen collected from Dayan Lake in Mongolia in 1909.

== Description ==
Aquilegia daingolica is a perennial herb growing to 25–70 cm (9.8–27.6 in) high, with upright stems branching towards the top and covered in glandular hairs. The basal leaves are 6–30 cm (2.4–11.8 in) long and biternate or ternate, and the leaf stalks are covered with simple or glandular hairs and measure 3–20 cm (1.2–7.9 in) long. The flowers face upwards or sideways, have a downy surface, and measure 3–5 cm (1.2–2.0 in) long by 5–8 cm (2.0–3.1 in) wide. The sepals are oval with pointed ends, blue or violet-blue, and 2.5–4 cm (0.98–1.57 in) long, and the petals are two-coloured, light blue to violet at the base and white or light blue at the tips. The nectar spurs are blue and 1.5–3 cm (0.59–1.18 in) long, tapering uniformly in width and mostly straight, bent inward toward the tip and with a blackish, clublike end. The stamens are dark-coloured.

The type specimen was collected between 27 and 29 July 1909 by V.V. Sapozhnikov by Dayan Lake in Mongolia; a specimen that was later identified as a paratype was collected in 1906. It was formally described by Andrey Erst and Dmitri Shaulo in 2013. The species is a stabilized ancient hybrid of Aquilegia glandulosa, Aquilegia oxysepala, and probably Aquilegia sibirica. It is similar in its flowers and fruit aggregates to A. glandulosa and in its dark anthers and black clublike spur tips to A. oxysepala, but the form of its spurs differentiates it from all other Asian forms of Aquilegia.

Aquilegia daingolica is endemic to the steppe habitat of the western slopes of Dayan Lake in northwestern Mongolia. The specific epithet daingolica is taken from the placename "Daingol", another name for Dayan Lake in Mongolia. As of December 2024, the species has not been assessed for the IUCN Red List.
