= Aquilegia hebeica =

Scientific classification
- Kingdom: Plantae
- Clade: Tracheophytes
- Clade: Angiosperms
- Clade: Eudicots
- Order: Ranunculales
- Family: Ranunculaceae
- Genus: Aquilegia
- Species: A. hebeica

Binomial name
- Aquilegia hebeica Erst

Species of flowering plant native to China

Aquilegia hebeica is a perennial flowering plant in the family Ranunculaceae, native to northern China.

== Description ==
Aquilegia hebeica is a perennial herbaceous plant with a short, erect taproot bearing 5–10 branching stems 30–55 cm (12–22 in) tall, branching towards the top. The leaves are thick, dark green on the upperside and greyish underneath. The basal leaves are ternate or biternate and measure 18–22 cm (7.1–8.7 in) long, with stalks of 10–15 cm (3.9–5.9 in). Both the stems and leaves are covered with simple and glandular hairs. The leaflets are egg-shaped with 2–7 rounded teeth on the edge. The flowers are nodding and measure 1.2–2.1 cm (0.5–0.8 in) long by 1.2–1.5 cm (0.5–0.6 in) in diameter, with pale blue or lilac-blue egg-shaped sepals of 5–8 mm length. The petals are purple or violet and 9–13 mm long, with thin nectar spurs that are bent or slightly hooked and measure 5–7 mm. The stamens measure 1–1.5 cm (0.4–0.6 in) and protrude beyond the petals by around 7 mm, and the anthers are yellow.

== Taxonomy ==
The species was formally described by the Russian botanist Andrey S. Erst and colleagues in 2017, from a type specimen collected on a roadside near water in Miyun, Beijing, on 8 May 1972, and additional specimens from the Beijing region and Hebei and Shanxi provinces. Erst noted that the species was usually identified in the past as Aquilegia viridiflora vars. viridiflora and atropurpurea, or as Aquilegia yabeana, the latter especially in the fruiting stage due to the robust stem and leaves. Within the genus, A. hebeica is most closely related to A. viridiflora and A. kamelinii.

=== Etymology ===
The specific epithet hebeica means "of Hebei", referring to the Chinese province where the species is chiefly found.

== Distribution and habitat ==
Aquilegia hebeica is native to north-central China, in Hebei and Shanxi provinces and the Beijing region. It grows in moist, shaded rocky places and ravines.

== Conservation ==
As of January 2025, the species has not been assessed for the IUCN Red List. In the formal species description in 2017 the authors recommend it be included in the Not Evaluated (NE) category of IUCN Red List categories, due to the lack of distribution and population data.

== Ecology ==
Aquilegia hebeica flowers from April to May and fruits from May to July.
