= Patrin =

Patrin may refer to:

- Patrin, symbol or signpost left for later travellers in Romani culture
- Eugène Patrin, French mineralogist and botanist.
- Patrin, the name.
