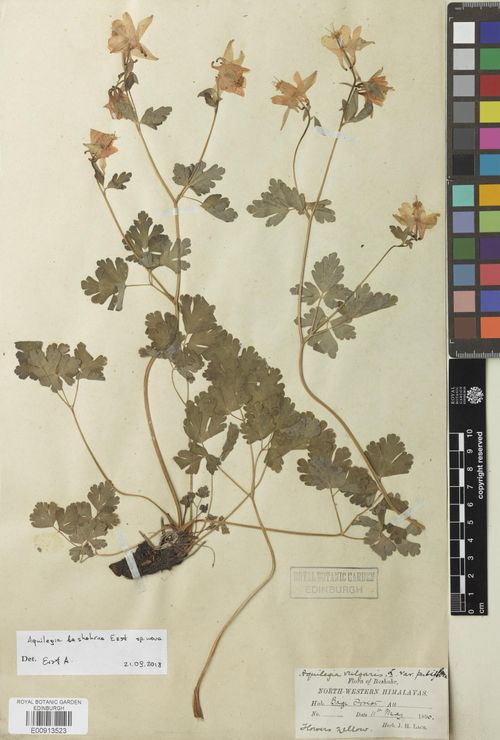
- Preserved specimen of Aquilegia bashahrica

Scientific classification
- Kingdom: Plantae
- Clade: Tracheophytes
- Clade: Angiosperms
- Clade: Eudicots
- Order: Ranunculales
- Family: Ranunculaceae
- Genus: Aquilegia
- Species: A. bashahrica

Binomial name
- Aquilegia bashahrica Erst

= Aquilegia bashahrica =

Species of flowering plant

Aquilegia bashahrica is a perennial flowering plant in the family Ranunculaceae, endemic to the Himalayas.

== Description ==
Aquilegia bashahrica is a perennial herb growing to 20 to 80 cm (7.9 to 31.5 in) tall. It has a short, vertical taproot bearing one to three annual flowering stems, which are sparsely pubescent. The leaves are somewhat thick and fleshy with a dark green upper side and greyish underside. The basal leaves are biternate or triternate (i.e. with three stalks, each with three leaflets that divide into three lobes) and measure 8–21 cm (3.1–8.3 in) long, with stalks of 5–15 cm (2.0–5.9 in) length covered in long white hairs. The plant produces between three and six nodding, yellow flowers measuring 2.5–4 cm (0.98–1.57 in) across which are smooth or sparsely hairy. The sepals are perpendicular to the flower, pointed, and 3–4 cm (1.2–1.6 in) long. The petals are teardrop-shaped, 2–3 cm (0.79–1.18 in) long, and bent outwards, with straight nectar spurs of 0.5–1.5 cm length, slightly curved at the tip. The stamens extend beyond the petals, and the anthers are yellow.

== Taxonomy ==
The type specimen was collected by John Henry Lace in 1890, in Bagi Forest, Bushahr, in what is now Himachal Pradesh in northern India. It was formally described as a separate species by Andrey S. Erst in 2020.

The flowers of A. bashahrica are unusual for Aquilegia, in which genus only those of Aquilegia pubiflora are similar. Both species have pointed egg-shaped sepals with a tapering, concave tip, outwardly-bent petals and small flowers. However, unlike A. pubiflora, A. bashahrica has yellow flowers, yellow rather than blackish anthers, anthers as long as or longer than the petals, and fleshy, dark green leaves. A. bashahrica is the only known Indian Aquilegia species with yellow flowers.

Alongside the formal description of the species, Erst also described a putative hybrid of the species and A. pubiflora named Aquilegia × emodi, with characteristics intermediate between the two species, such as bicoloured purple and yellow flowers.

=== Etymology ===
The specific epithet bashahrica is taken from Bashahr, a variant spelling of the former princely state of Bushahr, in which the type specimen was collected in 1890.

== Distribution and habitat ==
Aquilegia bashahrica is endemic to Himachal Pradesh in the Western Himalayas, growing in mountainous forests at altitudes of 2,400–2,600 m (7,900–8,500 ft).

== Conservation ==
As of December 2024, the species has not been assessed for the IUCN Red List. The species description in 2020 noted that there was insufficient data at that point to make an assessment of its risk status.

== Ecology ==
Aquilegia bashahrica flowers between April and May, and fruits between May and August.
