= A. sibirica =

A. sibirica is a taxonomic abbreviation which may refer to:

- Abies sibirica, the Siberian fir
- Aquilegia sibirica, the Siberian columbine
