= Aquilegia × emodi =

Scientific classification
- Kingdom: Plantae
- Clade: Tracheophytes
- Clade: Angiosperms
- Clade: Eudicots
- Order: Ranunculales
- Family: Ranunculaceae
- Genus: Aquilegia
- Species: A. × emodi

Binomial name
- Aquilegia × emodi Erst

Species of flowering plant

Aquilegia × emodi is a perennial flowering plant in the family Ranunculaceae, native to the Western Himalayas. It is a natural hybrid of Aquilegia bashahrica and Aquilegia pubiflora.

== Description ==
Aquilegia × emodi is a perennial herbaceous plant growing to 20–80 cm (8–31 in) in height. The leaves are thick and ternate. It produces 4–7 large, nodding, bicoloured flowers with oblong purple or violet sepals 2–3 cm (0.8–1.2 in) in length and rounded oblong yellow or greenish-white petals. The petals have purple or violet nectar spurs that are straight or hooked with a blackish tip. The stamens are the same length as the petals, and the anthers are yellow, or occasionally black or mixed in colour.

== Taxonomy ==
Aquilegia × emodi is a natural hybrid of Aquilegia bashahrica and Aquilegia pubiflora. It was formally described by Andrey Erst in 2020 from a type specimen collected near Narkanda in Shimla District, Himachal Pradesh on 10 May 1890.

Molecular phylogenetic studies suggest A. × emodi and its parent species belong to a monophyletic West Asian group of columbines, which separated from its closest relatives around 3.37 million years ago in the mid-Pliocene.

=== Etymology ===
The specific epithet emodi derives from the Sanskrit hima, meaning "snow".

== Distribution and habitat ==
Aquilegia × emodi is native to the Western Himalayas in northern India and western Nepal. It grows in mountainous forests at altitudes of 2,000–2,600 m (6,600–8,500 ft).

== Conservation ==
As of January 2025, the species has not been assessed for the IUCN Red List.

== Ecology ==
Aquilegia × emodi flowers from April to May, and fruits from May to August.
