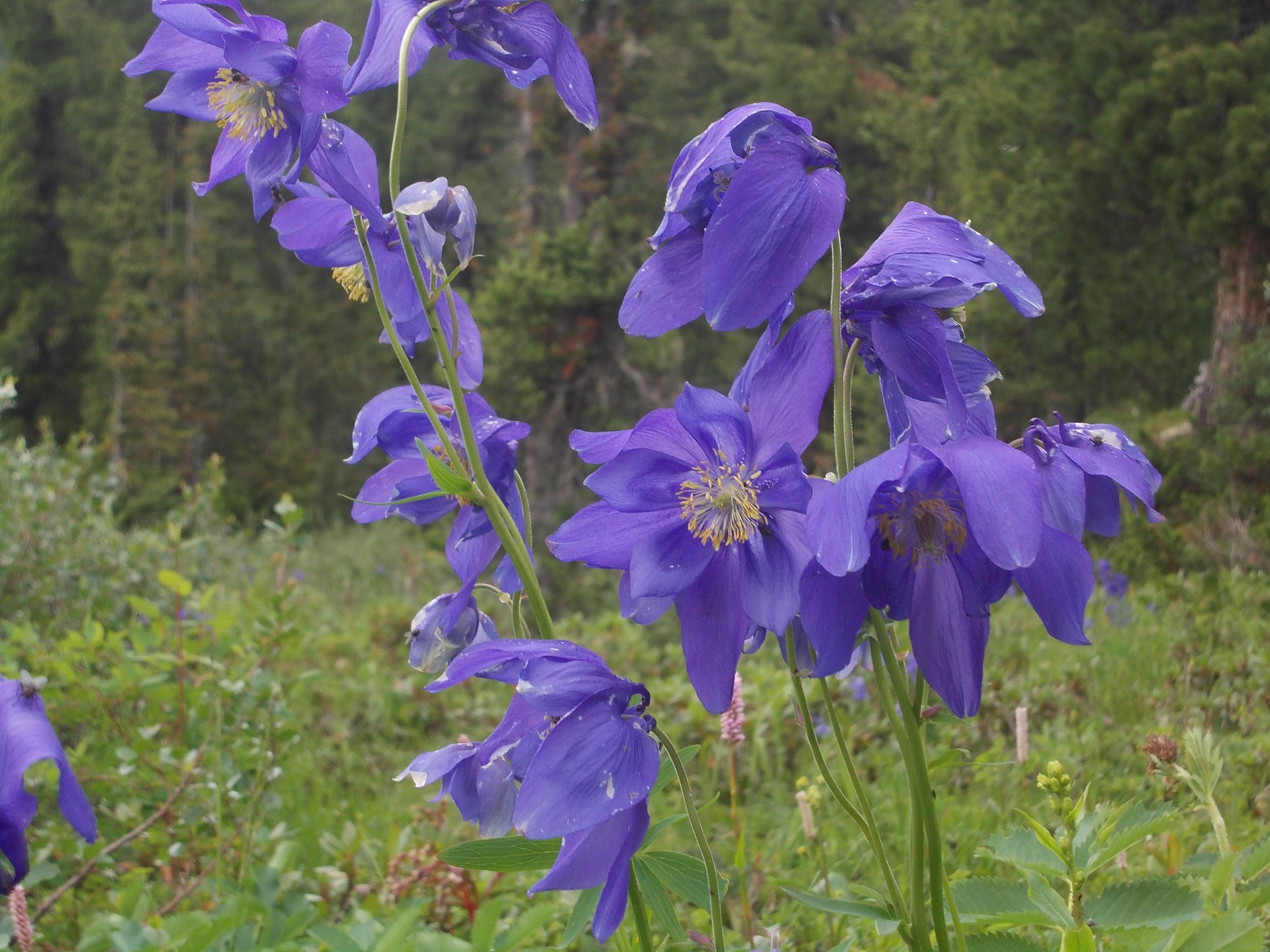
- Aquilegia glandulosa in flower

Scientific classification
- Kingdom: Plantae
- Clade: Tracheophytes
- Clade: Angiosperms
- Clade: Eudicots
- Order: Ranunculales
- Family: Ranunculaceae
- Genus: Aquilegia
- Species: A. glandulosa

Binomial name
- Aquilegia glandulosa Fisch. ex Link

Synonyms
- List: Aquilegia vulgaris subsp. glandulosa (Fisch. ex Link.) Brühl; Aquilegia alpina var. grandiflora (Walp.) DC.; Aquilegia brevicalcarata Kolok.; Aquilegia discolor Steud.; Aquilegia gebleri Besser ex Turcz.; Aquilegia glandulosa var. bicolor Fisch. ex Regel; Aquilegia glandulosa var. concolor DC.; Aquilegia glandulosa var. discolor DC.; Aquilegia glandulosa var. intermedia Regel; Aquilegia glandulosa var. jucunda (Fisch. & Avé-Lall.) Fisch. ex Regel; Aquilegia glandulosa var. parviflora Regel; Aquilegia glandulosa var. stenopetala Regel; Aquilegia glandulosa var. unicolor Regel; Aquilegia grandiflora (Walp.) Patrin ex DC.; Aquilegia grandiflora Schangin; Aquilegia jucunda Fisch. & Avé-Lall.; Aquilegia vulgaris var. gebleri Besser ex Brühl; Aquilegia vulgaris var. grandiflora Walp.; Aquilegia vulgaris subsp. jucunda (Fisch. & Avé-Lall.) Hook.f. & Thomson; Aquilegia vulgaris var. jucunda (Fisch. & Avé-Lall.) Brühl; Aquilegia vulgaris var. vera Brühl

= Aquilegia glandulosa =

North Asian species of columbine

Aquilegia glandulosa, the Altai columbine or Siberian columbine, is a perennial species of flowering plant in the family Ranunculaceae, native to northern and central Asia.

== Description ==
Aquilegia glandulosa is a compact species, growing to only 20–40 cm (7.9–15.7 in). Its basal leaves are narrow, blue-green, and biternate. The flowers measure 6–9 cm (2.4–3.5 in) in diameter and have blue sepals and white or blue petals with nectar spurs of 6–12 mm (0.24–0.47 in). The species is very similar to Aquilegia flabellata, the fan columbine, differing in having pubescent pistils and strongly hooked incurved spurs.

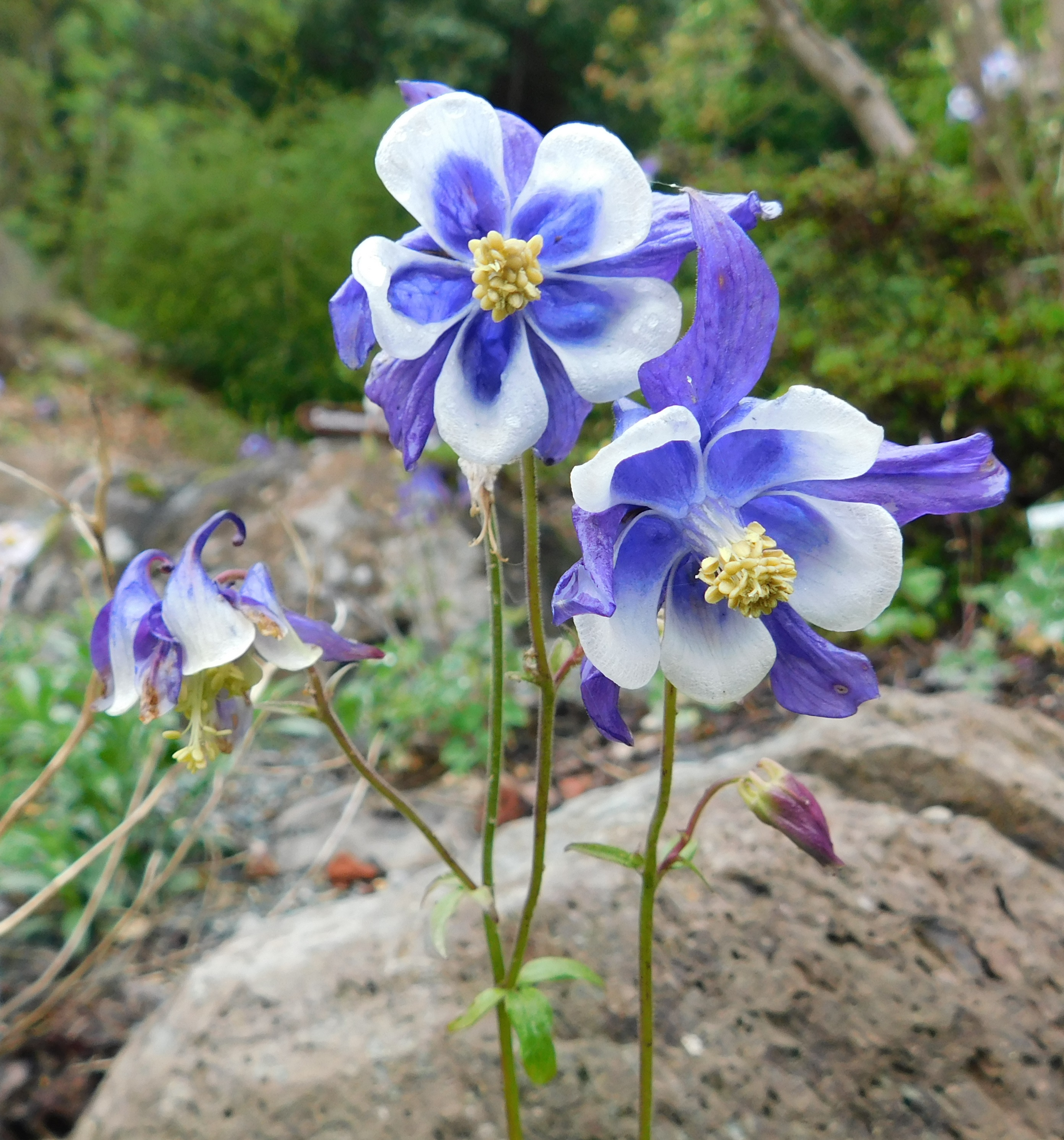
Bicoloured petals

== Taxonomy ==
Aquilegia glandulosa appears to be most closely related to Aquilegia sibirica, also known as the Siberian columbine, from which it probably diverged in the mid-Pleistocene.

=== Etymology ===
The specific epithet glandulosa means "glandular, having glands" in Latin.

== Distribution and habitat ==
The species is native to north-central Asia, including Russia (Altai, Buryatia, Irkutsk Oblast, Khanty-Mansi Autonomous Okrug, Krasnoyarsk Krai, Sakha Republic, Tuva, Yamalo-Nenets Autonomous Okrug, and Zabaykalsky Krai), Kazakhstan, Mongolia, India (Jammu and Kashmir), and China (Xinjiang). It grows in alpine meadows, and more rarely in forest zones, along stream-banks and on rocks, at altitudes of 1,900–2,700 m (6,200–8,900 ft).

== Ecology ==
Aquilegia glandulosa flowers between June and August.

== Conservation ==
The species has not been assessed for the IUCN Red List.
