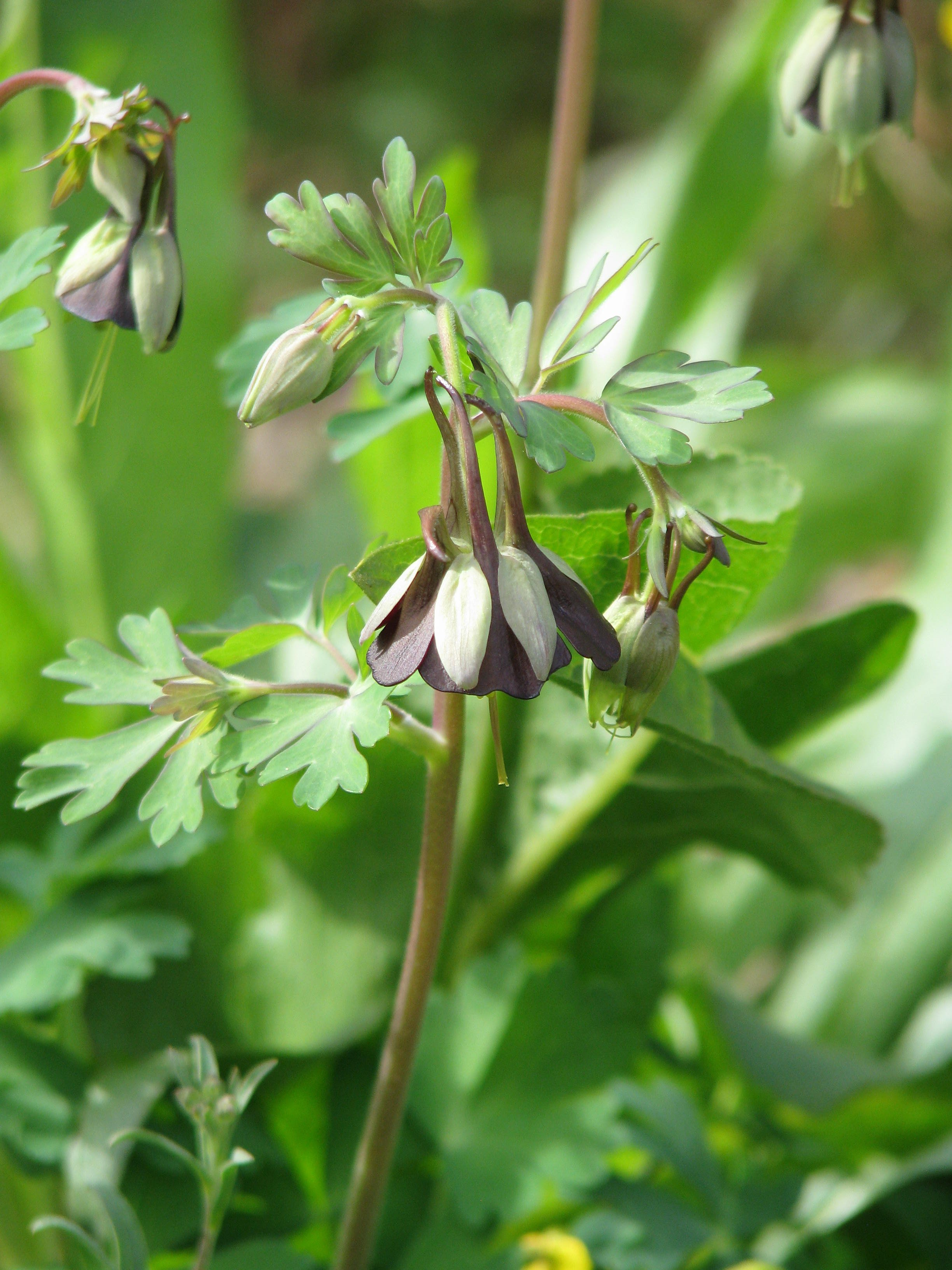
- Aquilegia viridiflora in flower in Henfield, UK

Scientific classification
- Kingdom: Plantae
- Clade: Tracheophytes
- Clade: Angiosperms
- Clade: Eudicots
- Order: Ranunculales
- Family: Ranunculaceae
- Genus: Aquilegia
- Species: A. viridiflora

Binomial name
- Aquilegia viridiflora Pall.

Synonyms
- List: Aquilegia atropurpurea Willd.; Aquilegia viridiflora f. atropurpurea (Willd.) Kitag.; Aquilegia atropurpurea var. brevistyla Willd.; Aquilegia atropurpurea var. dahurica (Patrin) DC.; Aquilegia atropurpurea var. fischeriana DC.; Aquilegia atropurpurea var. violacea Regel; Aquilegia dahurica Patrin; Aquilegia buriatica Peschkova; Aquilegia canadensis Pall.; Aquilegia elata Ledeb.; Aquilegia flava Lam.; Aquilegia hybrida Sims; Aquilegia hybrida var. caerulea Regel; Aquilegia hybrida var. intermedia Regel; Aquilegia hybrida var. lutea Regel; Aquilegia hybrida var. violacea Regel; Aquilegia lutea Lam.

= Aquilegia viridiflora =

Species of flowering plant

Aquilegia viridiflora, commonly known as the green columbine or green-flowered columbine, is a perennial flowering plant in the family Ranunculaceae, native to southern Siberia, northern China, Mongolia, and Japan.

== Description ==
Aquilegia viridiflora is a herbaceous perennial growing to 15 to 50 cm (5.9 to 19.7 in) tall, with hairy or glandular stems which often branch towards the top. It has few basal leaves, which are biternate and mostly smooth with stalks of up to 18 cm (7.1 in). It produces 3–7 nodding flowers measuring 1.5–2 cm (0.6–0.8 in) across which are either yellowish-green (in the variety viridiflora) or dark purple (atropurpurea). The sepals and petals measure 1.5 cm (0.6 in) or less and the petals have straight or slightly incurved nectar spurs of 1.2 to 1.8 cm (0.5 to 0.7 in) length.

== Taxonomy ==
There are two named varieties, distinguished by the colour of the flowers:

- A. viridiflora var. atropurpurea (Willd.) Finet & Gagnep. which is native to Mongolia, Siberia, and Hebei, southern Liaoning, Nei Mongol, eastern Qinghai, southern Shandong, and Shanxi provinces in China. It has purple flowers.
- A. viridiflora var. viridiflora, which is native to China (Gansu, Hebei, Heilongjiang, Hubei, Jilin, Liaoning, Nei Mongol, Ningxia, Shaanxi, Shandong, and Shanxi provinces), Japan, Mongolia, and Siberia. It has yellow-green flowers. Some authorities consider A. viridiflora var. viridiflora to be a synonym of A. viridiflora rather than a variety thereof.

The synonym Aquilegia canadensis is not to be confused with Aquilegia canadensis L., which is a different species of Aquilegia.

A. viridiflora 'Chocolate Soldier' is a cultivar with chocolate-brown flowers. It grows up to 30 cm (12 in) tall.

== Distribution and habitat ==
Aquilegia viridiflora is native to Japan, Mongolia, Russia (Buryatia, Tuva, and Zabaykalsky Krai in southern Siberia and the Amur Oblast in the Russian Far East), and to the Gansu, Hebei, Heilongjiang, Hubei, Jilin, Liaoning, Nei Mongol, Ningxia, eastern Qinghai, Shaanxi, Shandong, and Shanxi provinces in northern China. It grows in forests, grassy slopes, in damp places and by streams, at altitudes between 200 and 2,400 m (660 and 7,870 ft).

== Ecology ==
Aquilegia viridiflora flowers from May to July, and is pollinated by early spring bees of the genus Anthophora.

== Conservation ==
As of November 2024, the species has not been assessed for the IUCN Red List.

== Uses ==
Aquilegia viridiflora is grown as an ornamental plant.
