= Central Siberian Botanic Garden =

Botanic garden in the south-eastern part of Novosibirsk, Russia

- Центральный сибирский ботанический сад
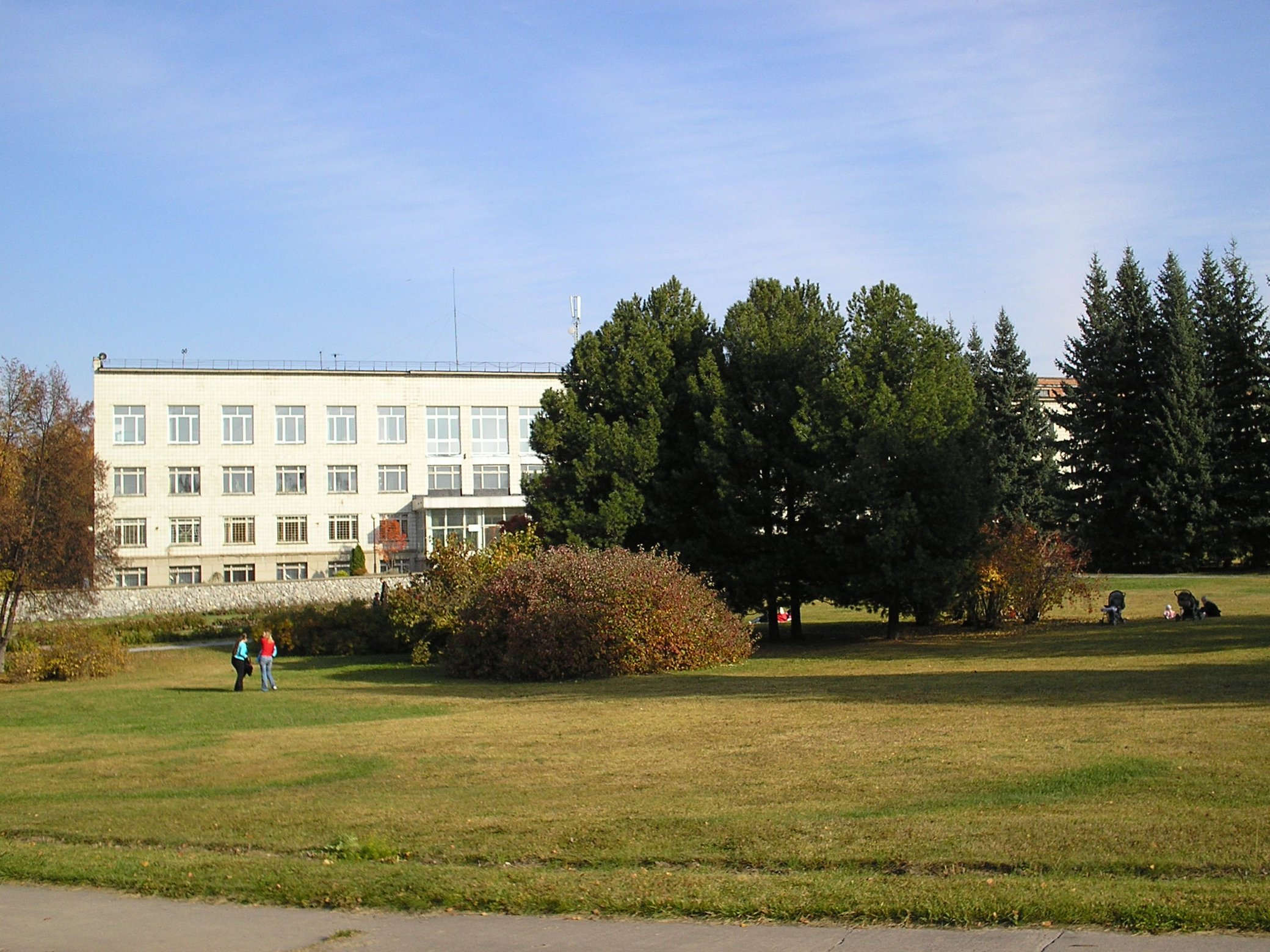
- Interactive map of Central Siberian Botanic Garden
- Location: Novosibirsk, Russia
- Coordinates: 54.82583°N 83.1094°E
- Area: 1,000 hectares (2,500 acres)

Central Siberian Botanic Garden (Russian: Центральный сибирский ботанический сад) is a botanic garden in the south-eastern part of Novosibirsk, Russia. It borders with Akademgorodok.

== History ==
Until 1964, the garden was located in Zayeltsovsky City District and covered an area of 232 hectares.

Since 1964, CSBG is located in Akademgorodok.

== Description ==
Central Siberian Botanic Garden is a center of botanical and ecological research.

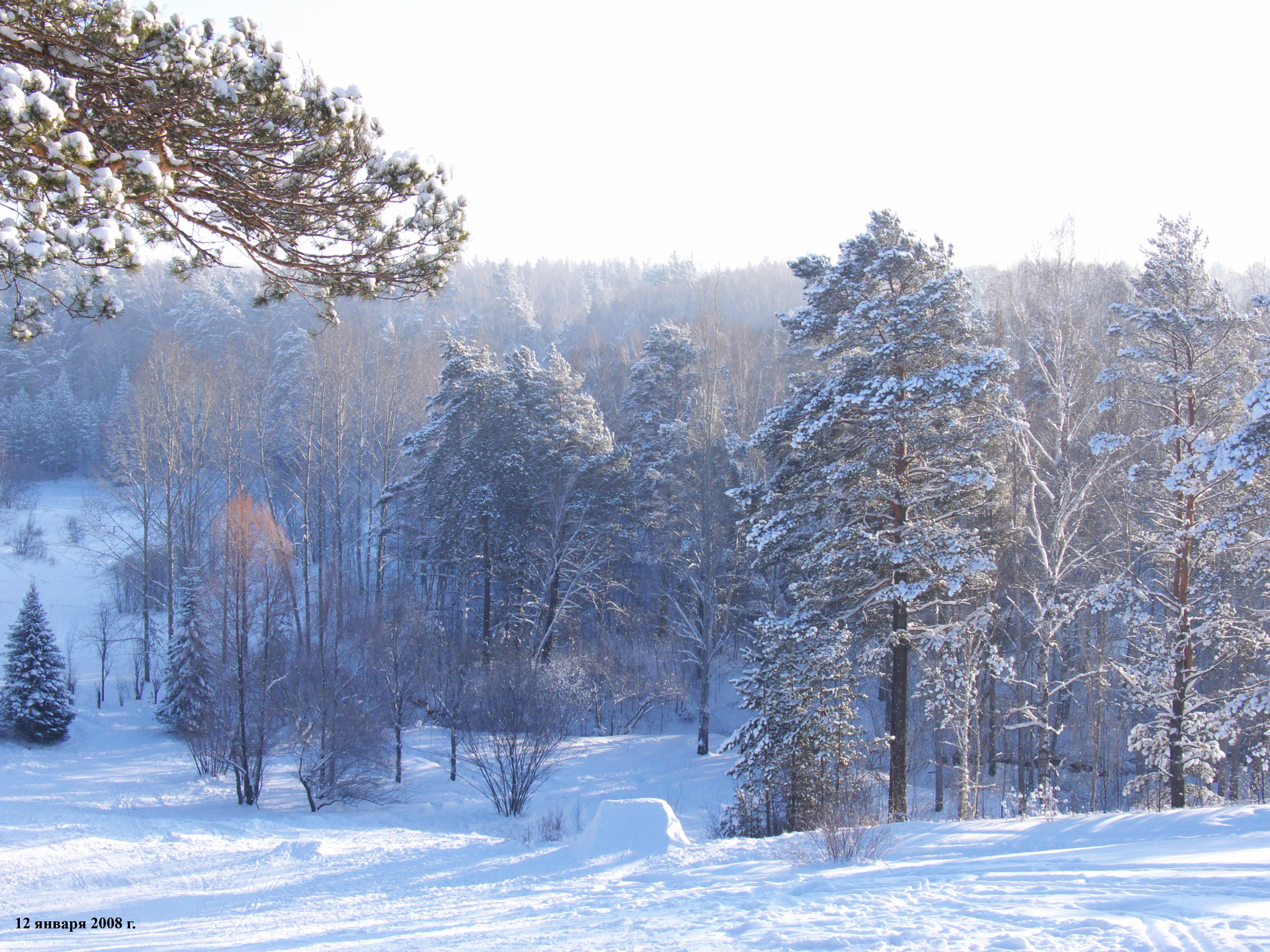

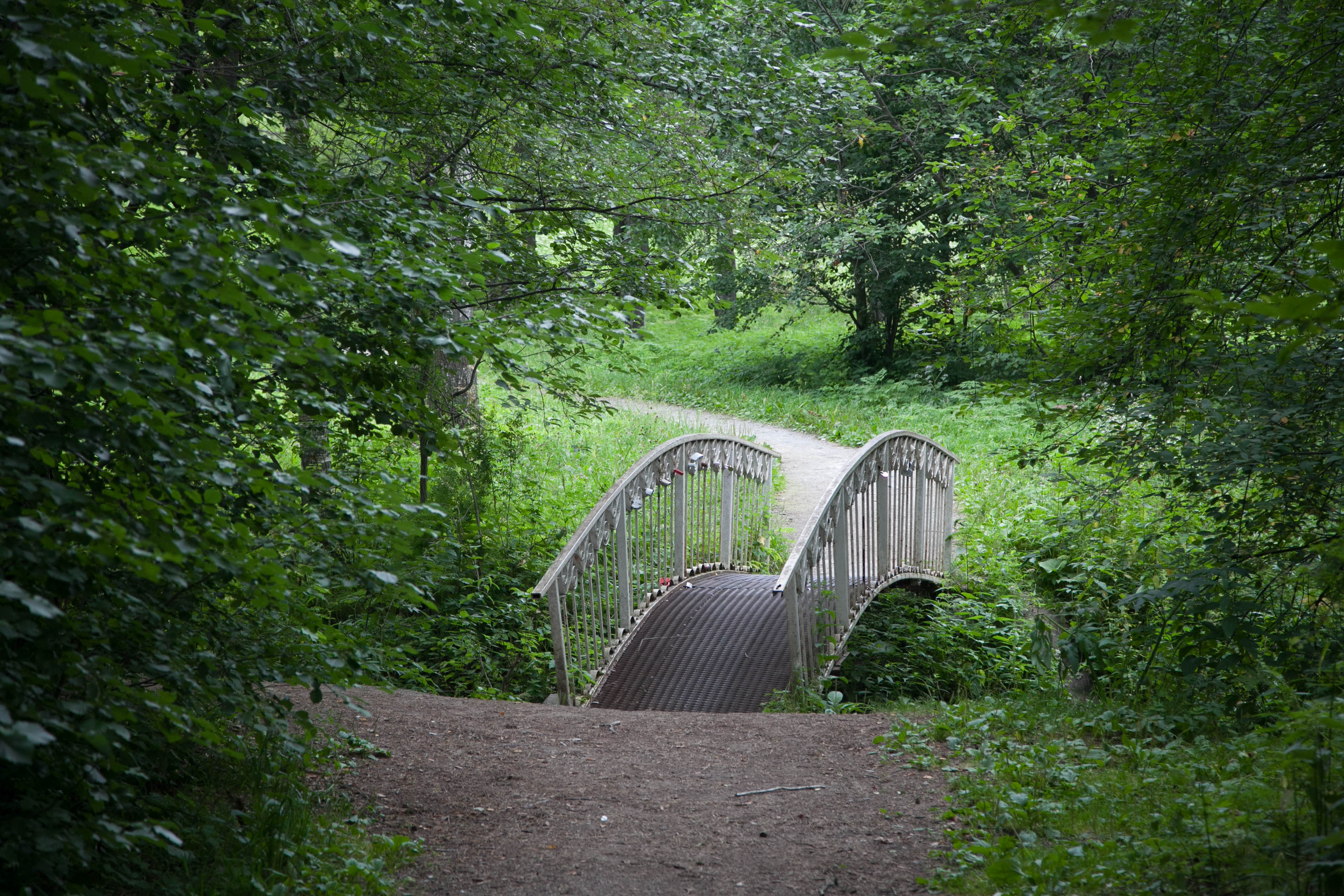

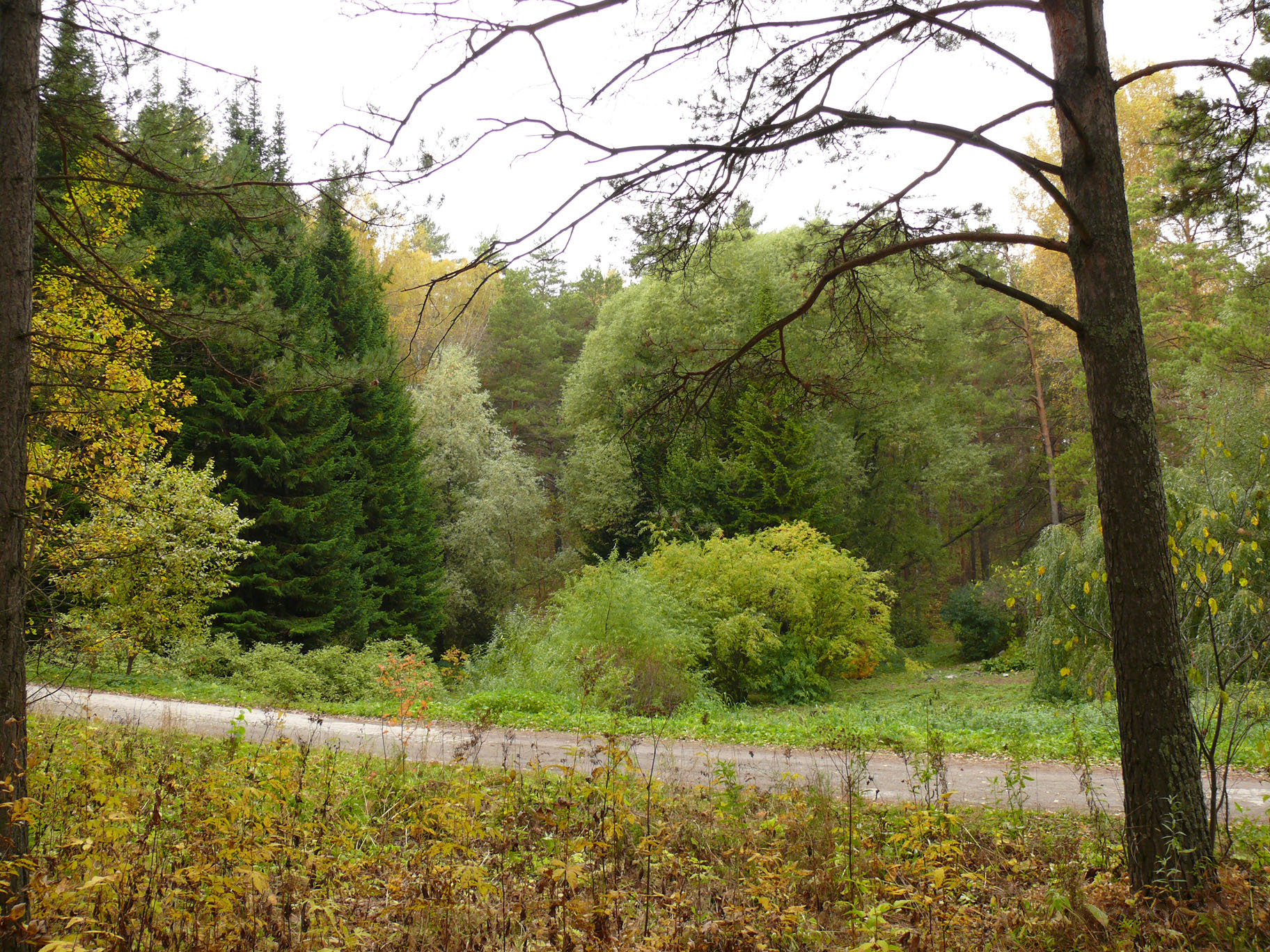

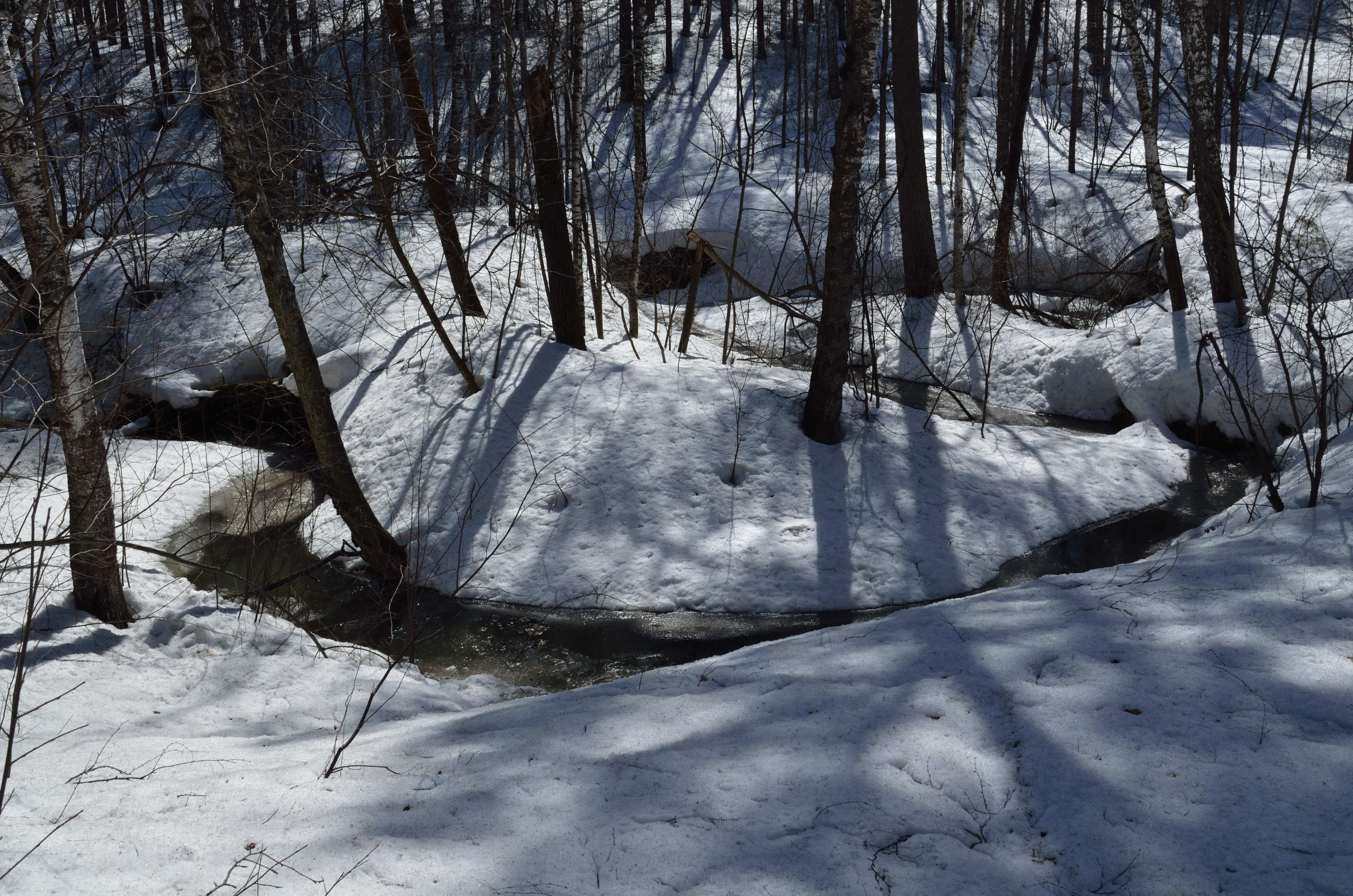
Zyryanka River

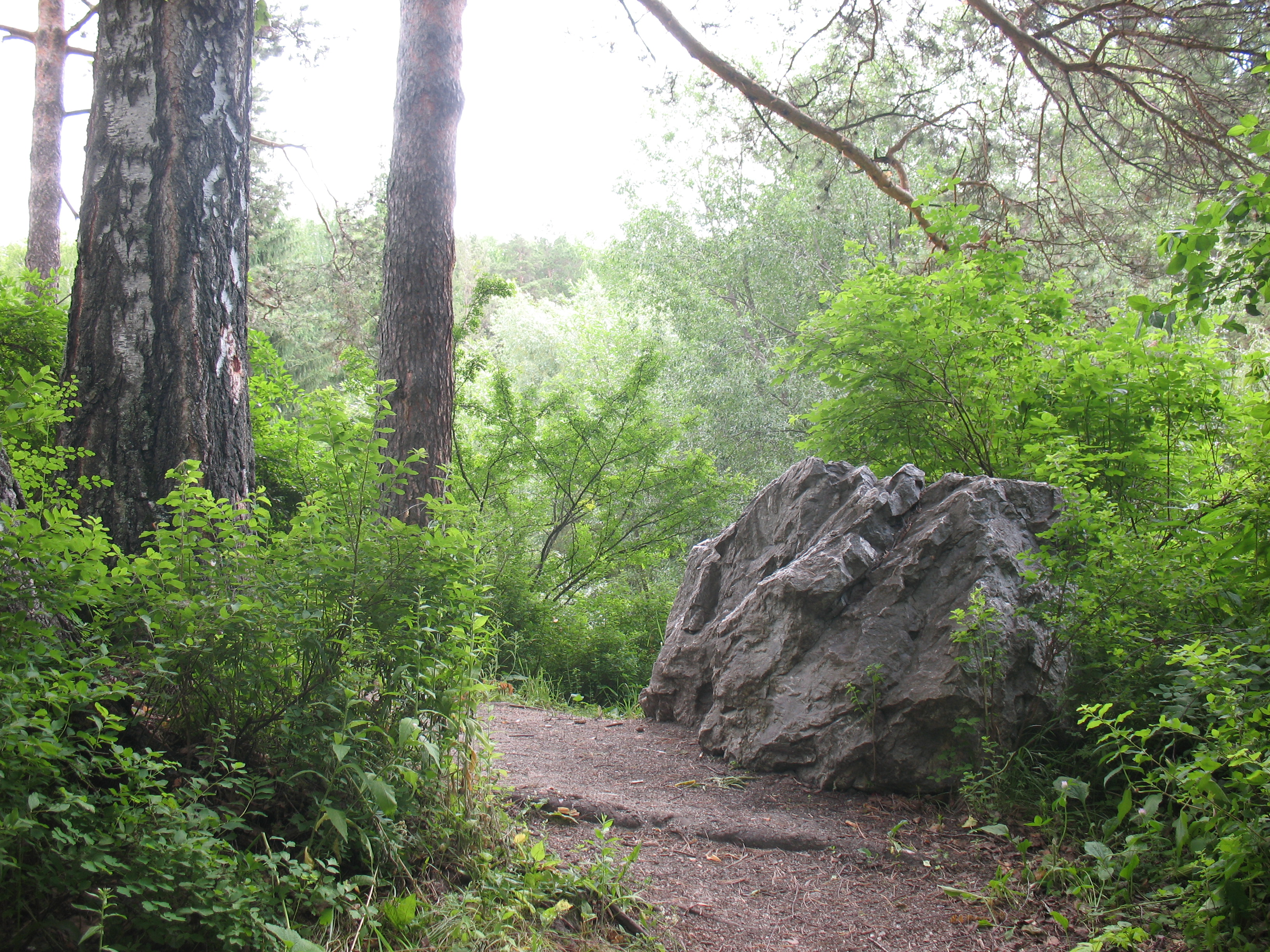

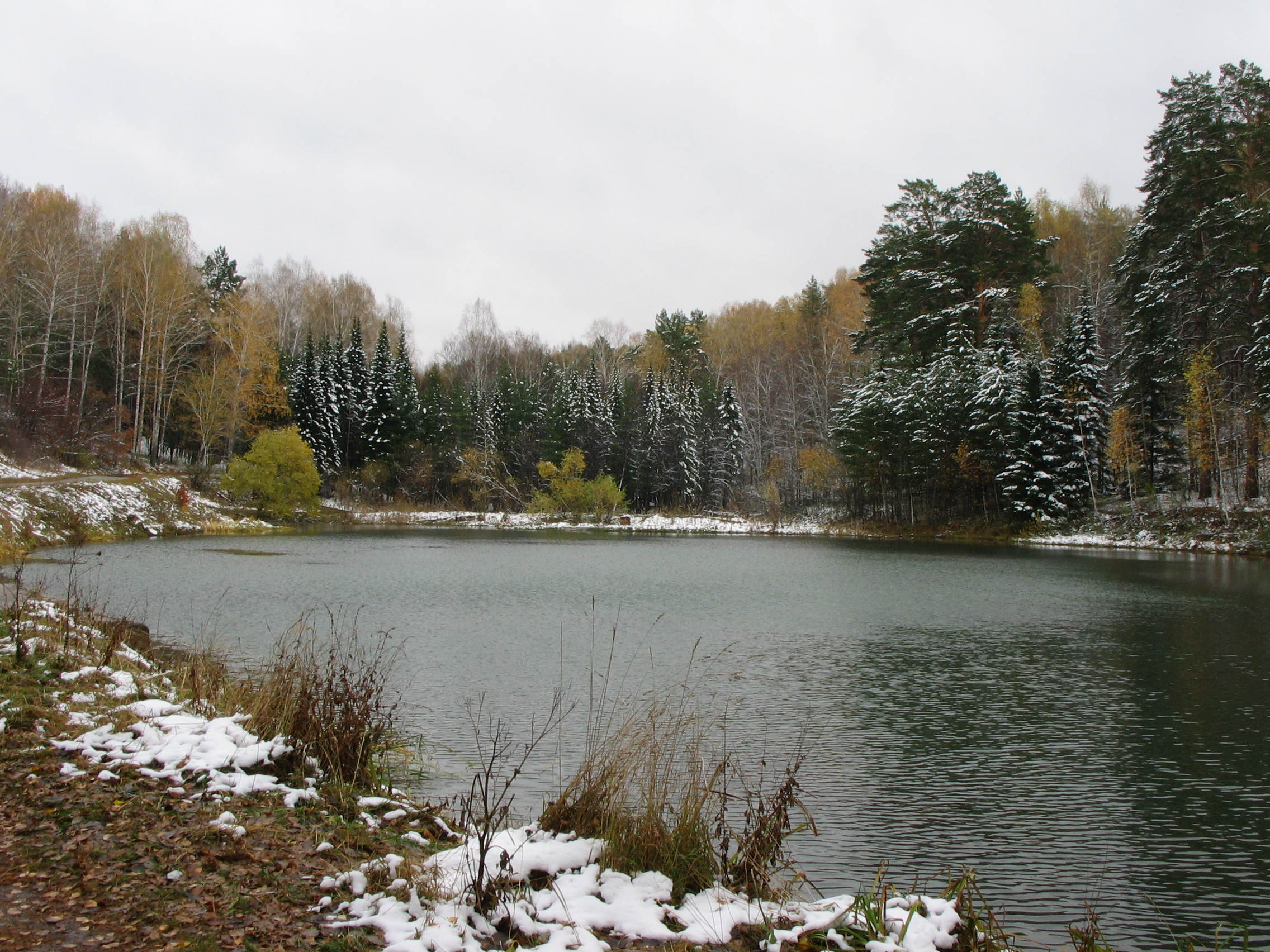

== Fauna ==
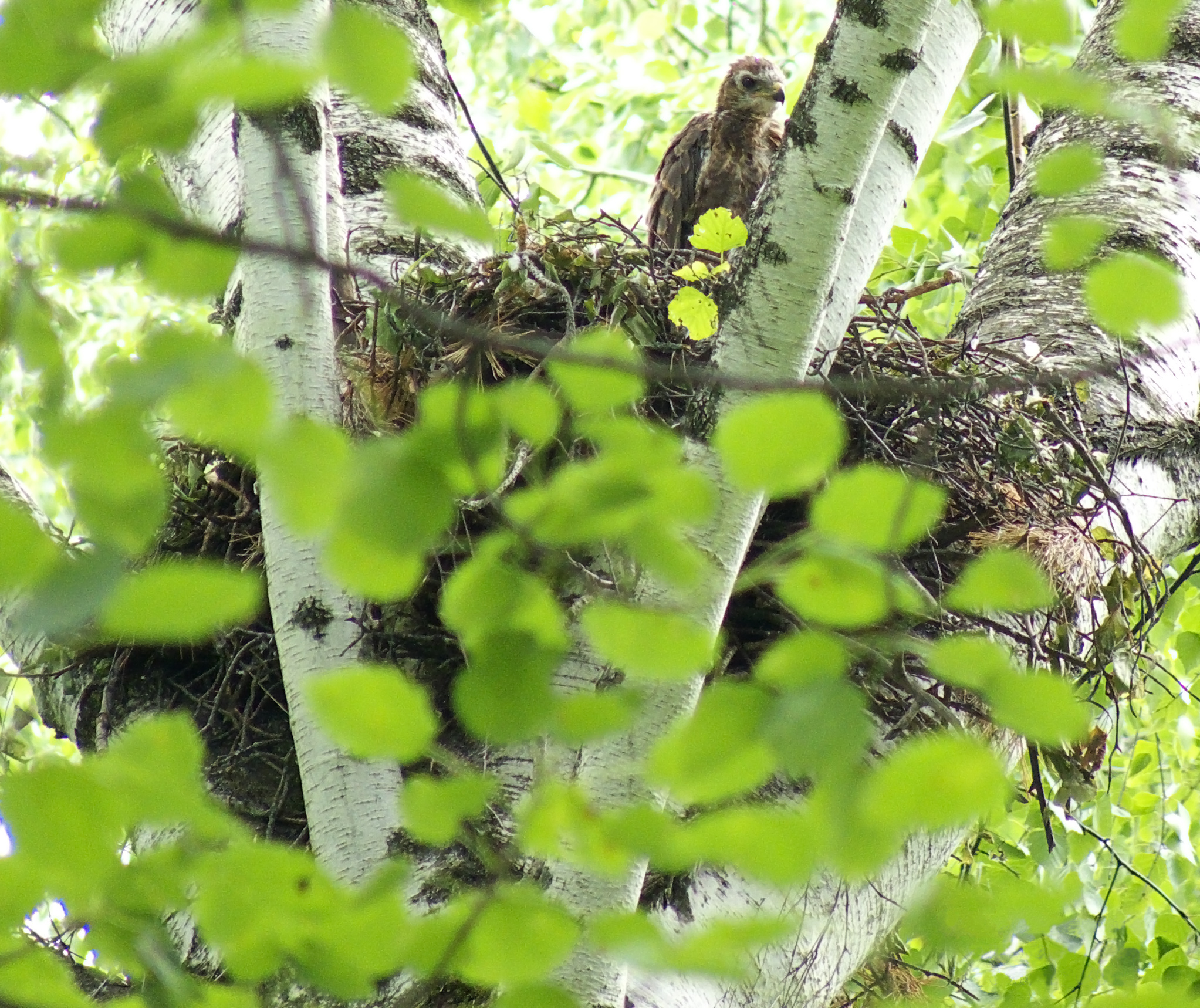
A young buzzard

=== Birds ===
- Black kite
- Common buzzard
- Eurasian sparrowhawk
- Northern goshawk
- European honey buzzard
- Ural owl
- Great grey owl
- Long-eared owl
- Boreal owl

=== Mammals ===
Squirrels, chipmunks, beavers, hares, weasels, foxes and other animals inhabit the garden.

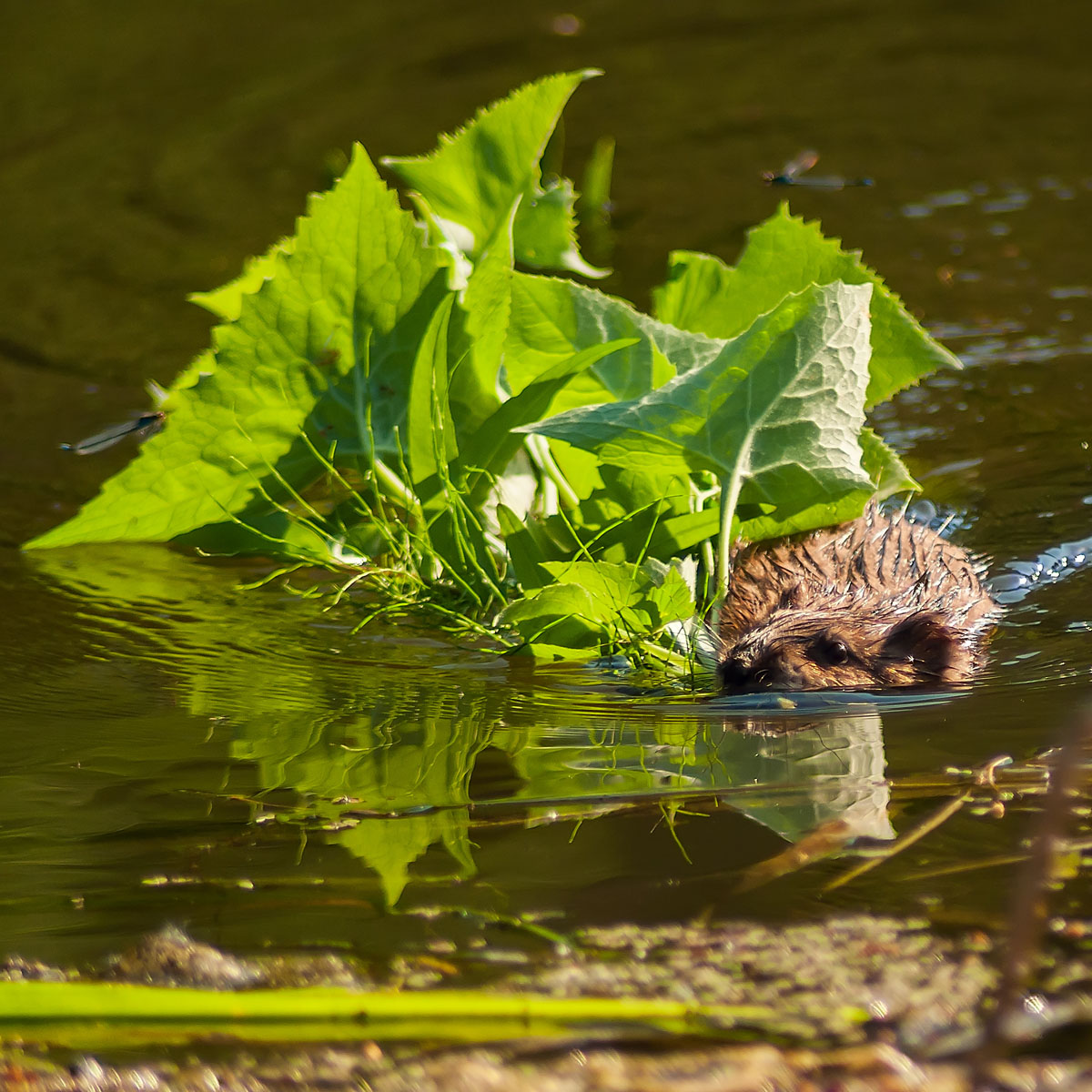
Muskrat

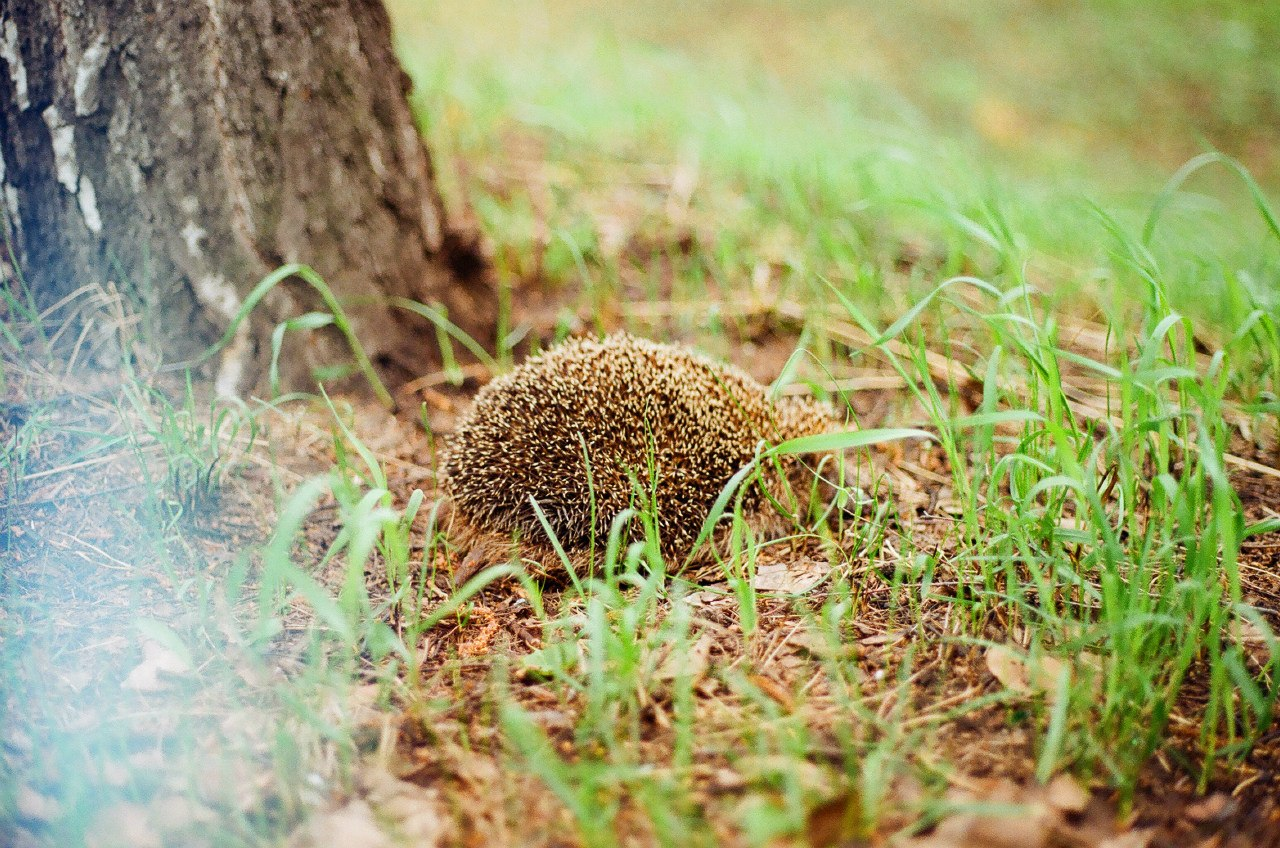
Hedgehog

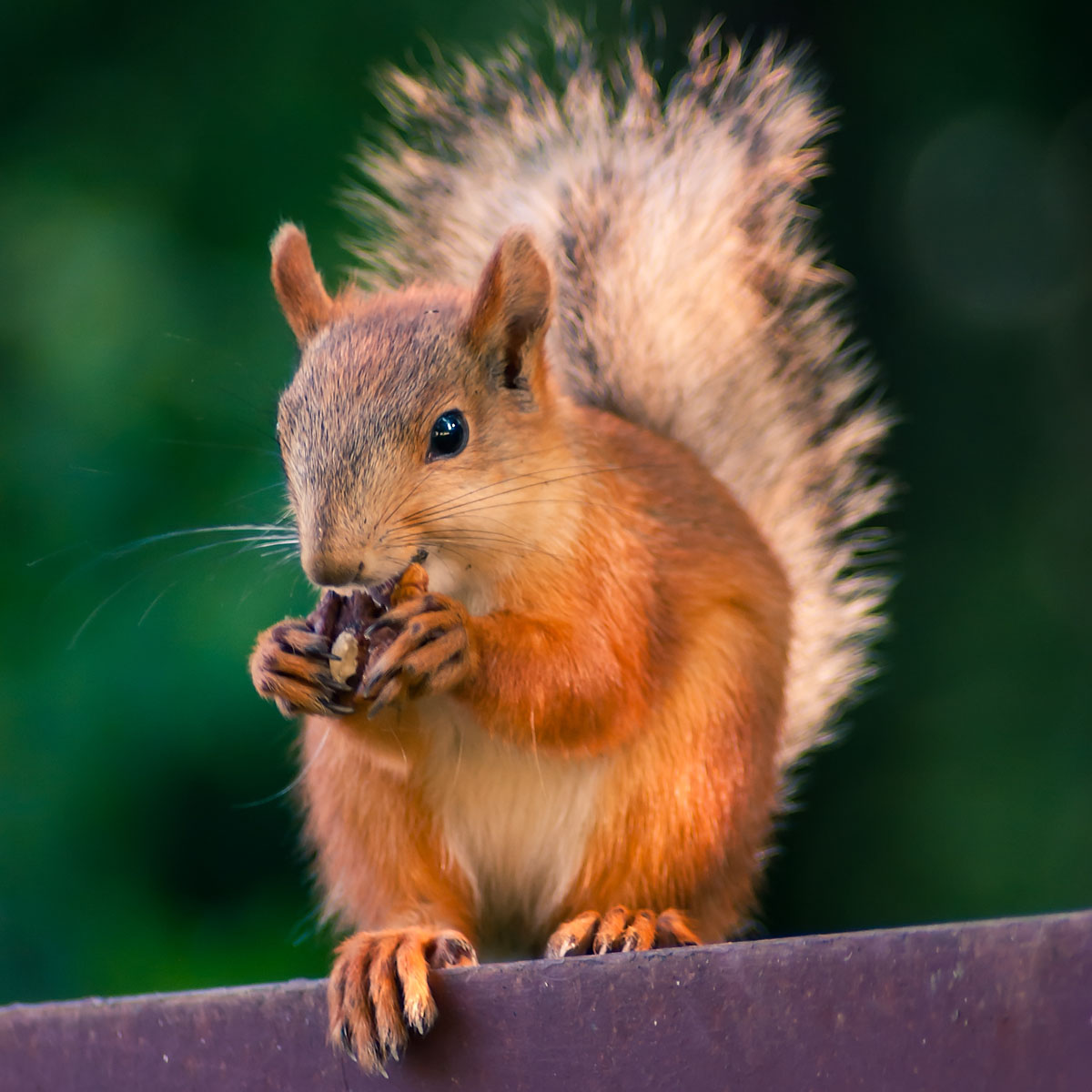
Squirrel

== Flora ==
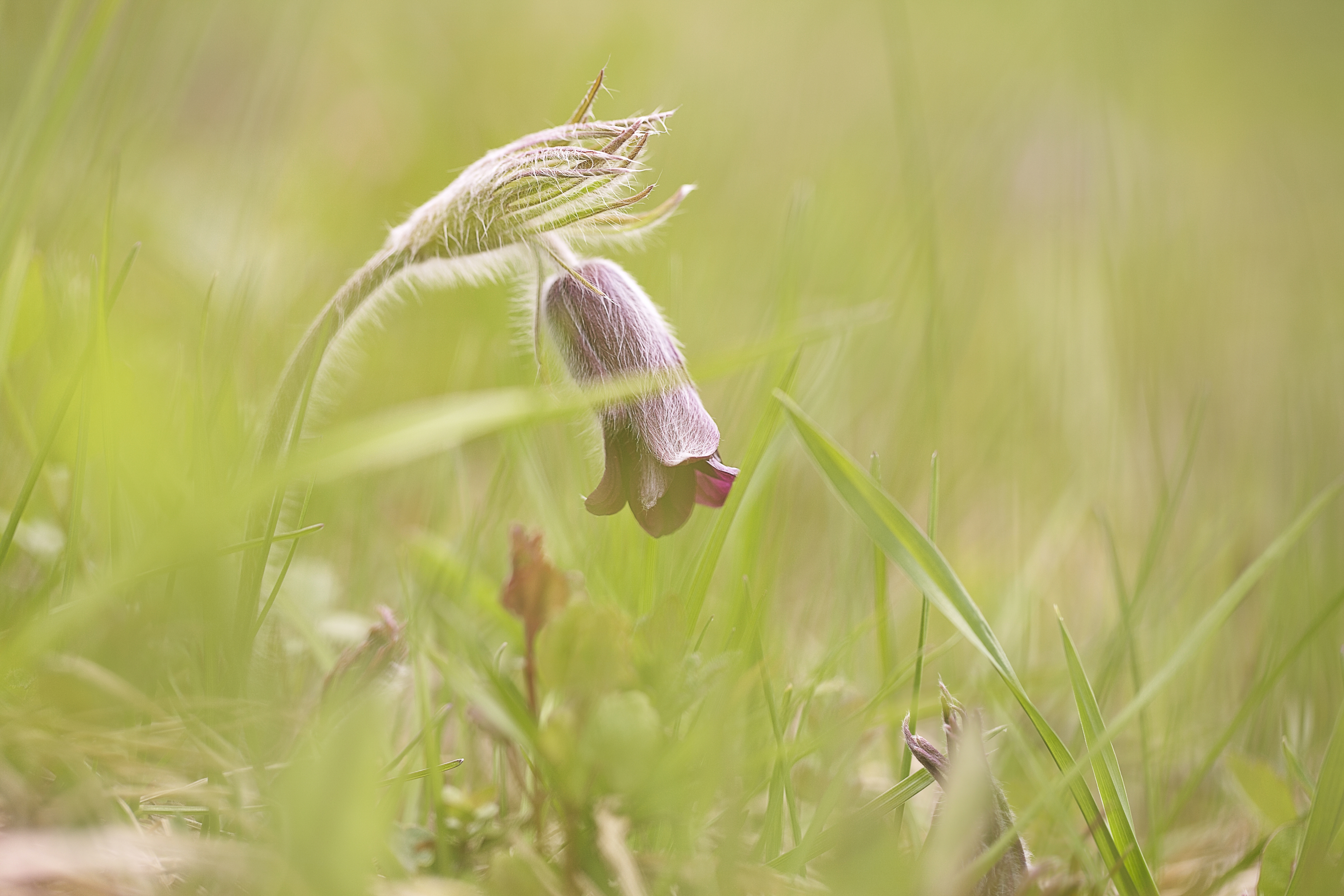
Pulsatilla patens

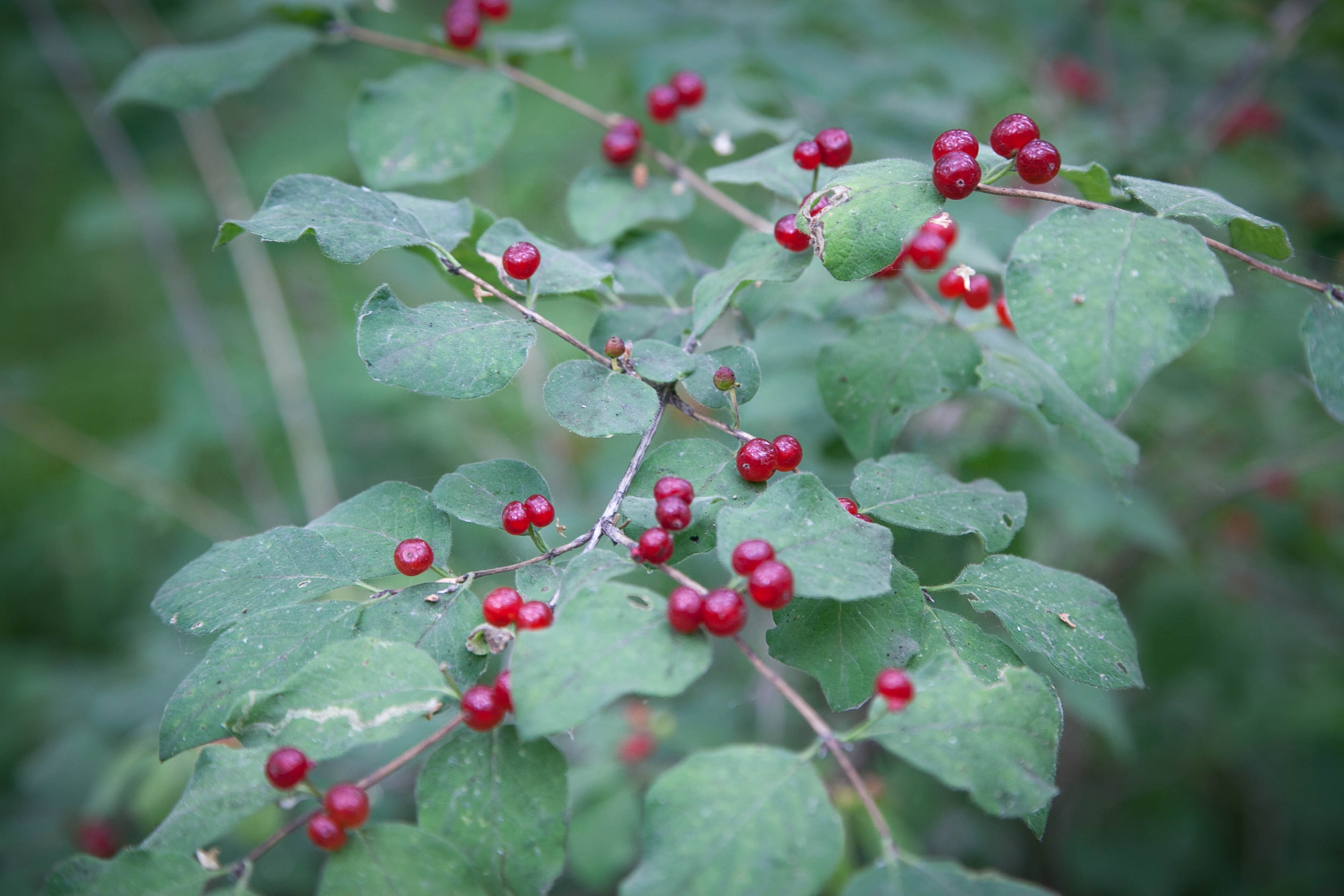

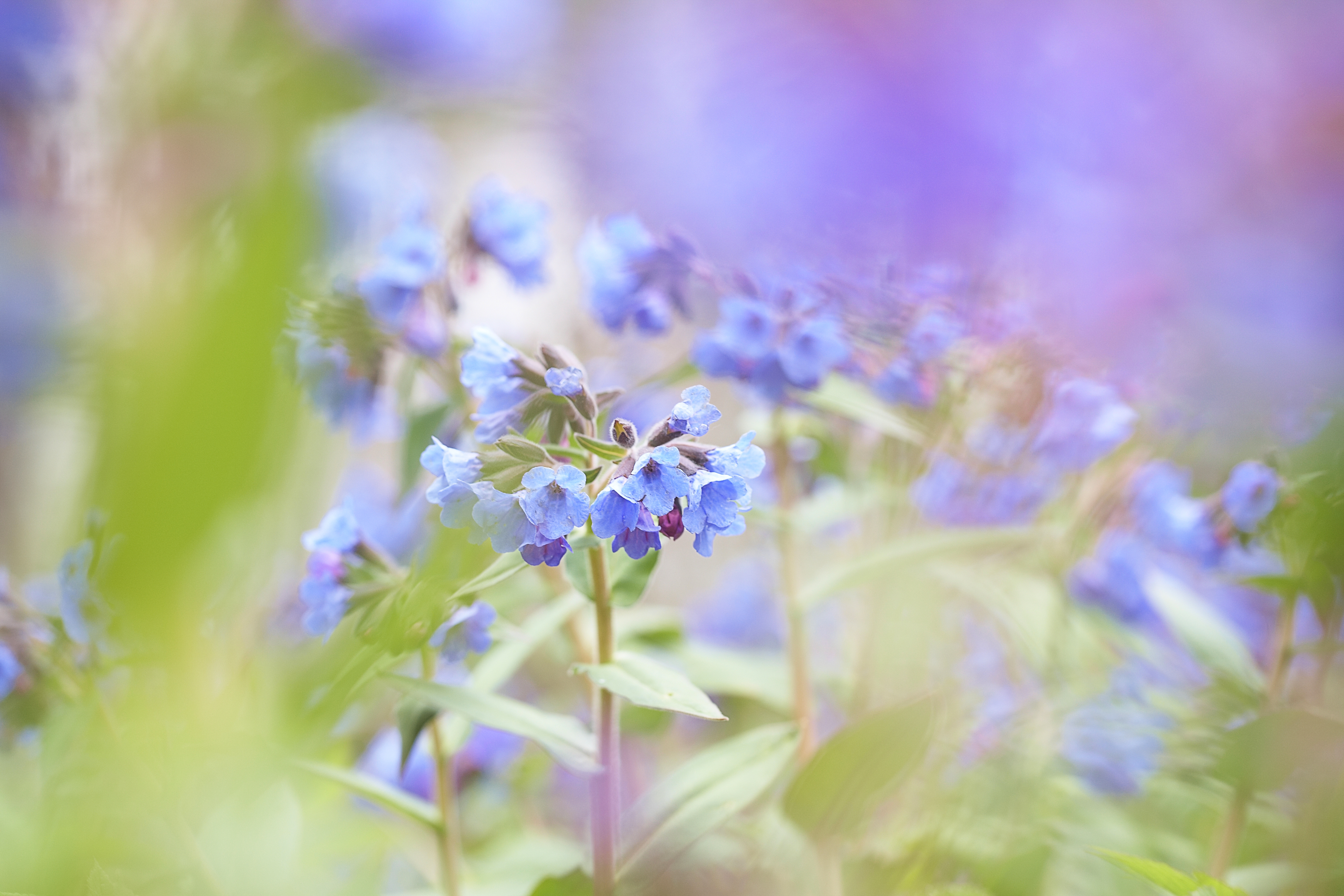

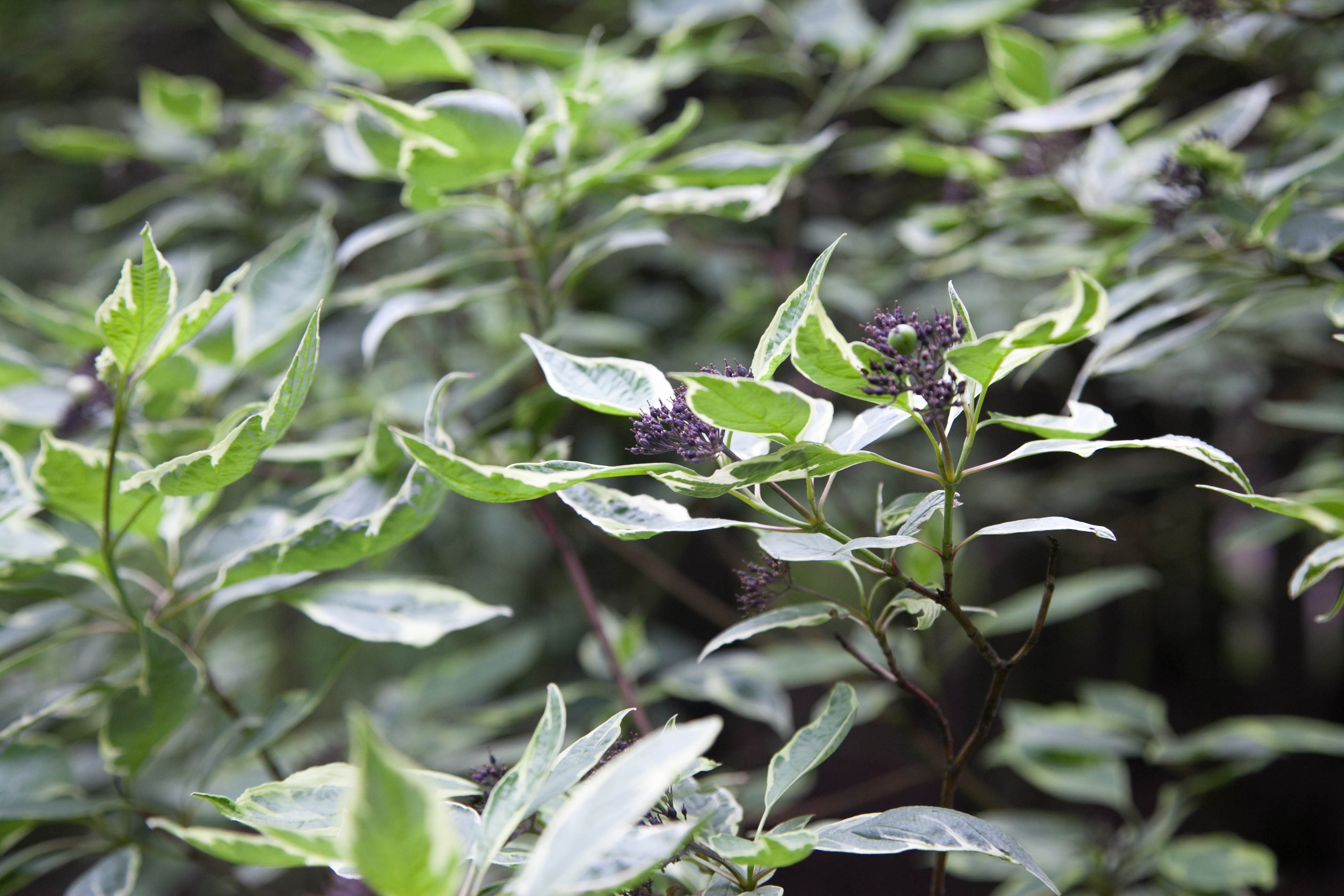
