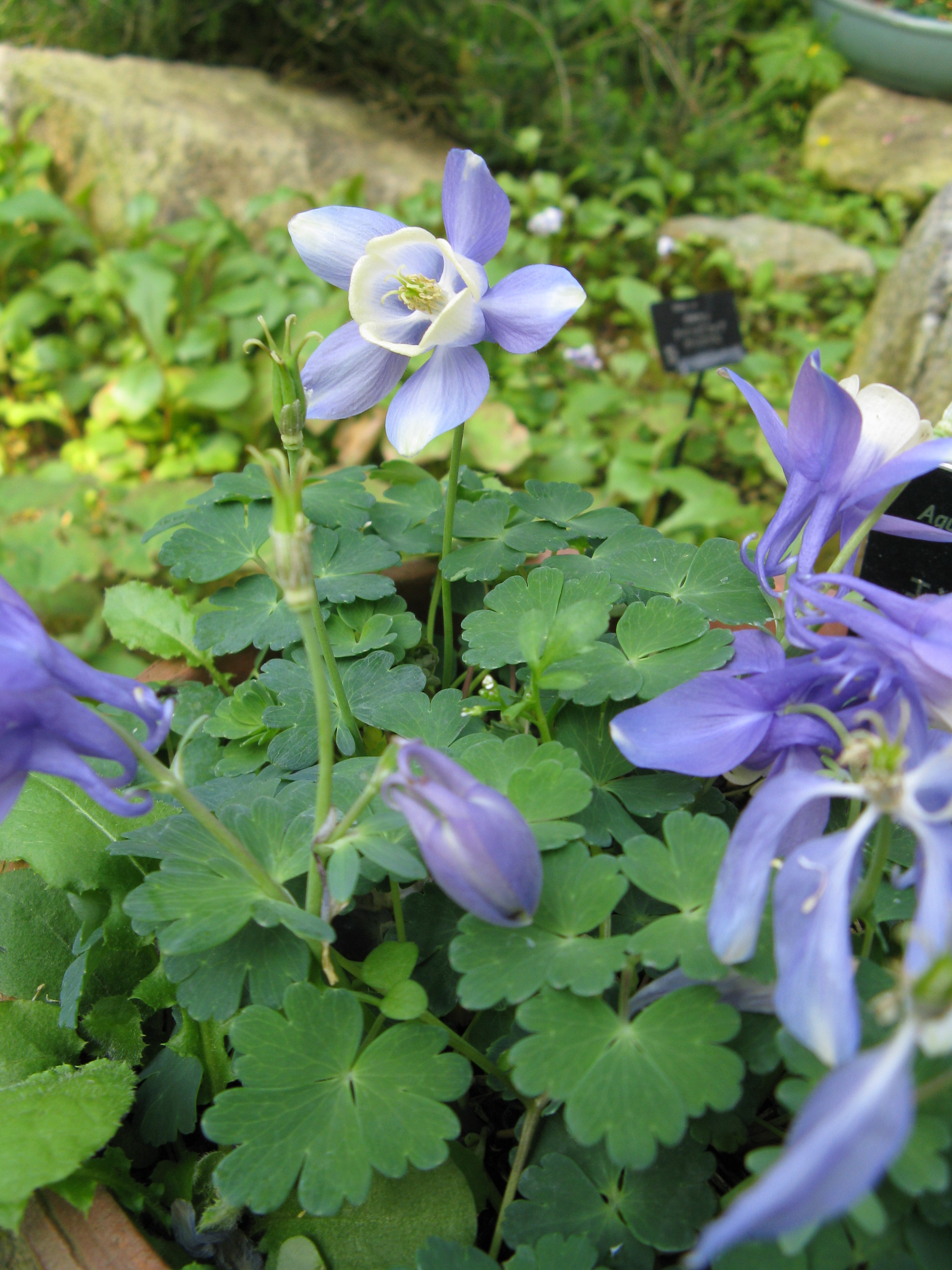
- Aquilegia sibirica (Siberian columbine)
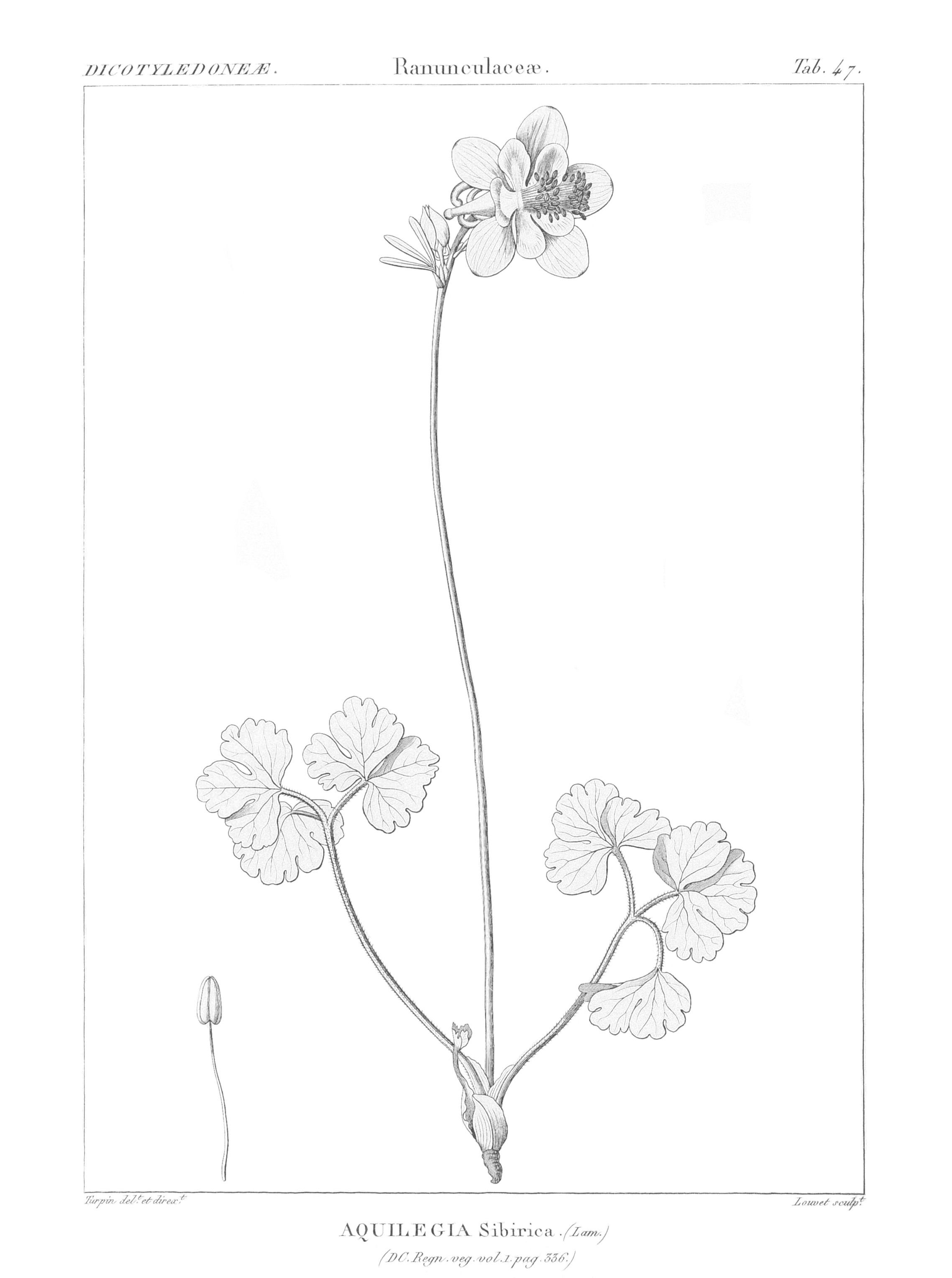
- Botanical illustration by Pierre Jean François Turpin

Scientific classification
- Kingdom: Plantae
- Clade: Embryophytes
- Clade: Tracheophytes
- Clade: Spermatophytes
- Clade: Angiosperms
- Clade: Eudicots
- Order: Ranunculales
- Family: Ranunculaceae
- Genus: Aquilegia
- Species: A. sibirica

Binomial name
- Aquilegia sibirica Lamarck
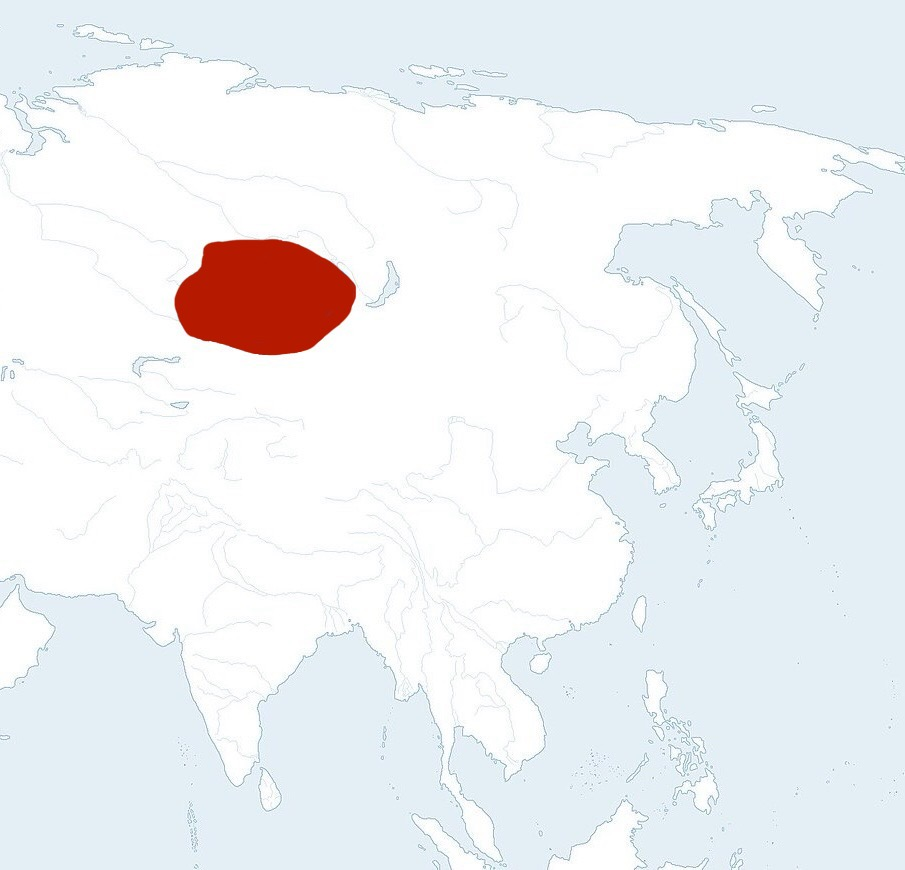
- Native range of Aquilegia sibirica in Asia

Synonyms
- List: Aquilegia bicolor Ehrh.; Aquilegia grandiflora Patrin ex DC.; Aquilegia sibirica var. bicolor Regel; Aquilegia sibirica var. concolor C.A.Mey.; Aquilegia sibirica var. discolor C.A.Mey.; Aquilegia sibirica var. grandiflora DC.; Aquilegia sibirica var. ircutiana Fisch., C.A.Mey. & Avé-Lall.; Aquilegia sibirica var. media Rapaics; Aquilegia sibirica var. stenopetala Regel; Aquilegia speciosa DC.; Aquilegia speciosa var. bicolor (Ehrh.) DC.; Aquilegia speciosa var. concolor DC.; Aquilegia vulgaris var. daurica Willd.; Aquilegia vulgaris var. sibirica L.; Aquilegia vulgaris var. speciosa Aiton

= Aquilegia sibirica =

Species of flowering plant

Aquilegia sibirica, the Siberian columbine, is a species of flowering plant in the family Ranunculaceae native to the north-central Asian regions of Siberia, northern Mongolia, Kazakhstan, and Xinjiang. A hardy perennial plant, it prefers temperate environments. The Siberian columbine can be between 1 foot (0.30 m) and 2 feet (0.61 m) tall with flowers that are lilac-blue and white in color.

The clade containing A. sibirica diverged from Aquilegia ecalcarata–the only Aquilegia species to lack nectar spurs–between 4.5 and 6 million years ago. Crosses between the two species have been studied to determine what gene is responsible for Aquilegia nectar spurs. In Mongolia, A. sibirica is considered a medicinal herb and extracts from the plant have been determined to act as an antifungal agent.

== Description ==
In common with other Aquilegia species, the Siberian columbine possesses nectar spurs. Pollination of A. sibirica is generally caused by bees. (Note: Other pollinators are more prevalent among other Aquilegia species, such as hummingbirds for A. formosa and hawk moths for A. chrysantha.) It is also favored by other pollinators such as butterflies and, in the flower's introduced North American populations, hummingbirds. A. sibirica is resistant to the fungal disease verticillium wilt. The plant prefers temperate environments. Also in common with other Aquilegia, A. sibirica is a hardy perennial plant. A. sibirica grows well in shady settings and tolerates various soils.

The plant has nearly glabrous bi- and triternate leaves with leaflets that run between one and two inches across. Stems are leafless, with many terminating in flowers. Siberian columbine flowers are lilac-blue to white. The flower is bisexual and features fruit that is indehiscent (meaning it does not split to release seeds) in the form of a follicle. The plant may be between 1 foot (0.30 m) and 2 feet (0.61 m) tall in height. In northern latitudes, the flower blooms between May and June.

Petals on A. sibirica develop a curvature relatively early and at a shorter length–between 1 centimetre (0.39 in) and 2 centimetres (0.79 in)–than other Aquilegia species. The petals fold longitudinally. As nectar spurs of different Aquilegia species develop, they demonstrate greater variance. In the case of A. sibirica's nectar spurs, they possess greater curvature than those of A. formosa and A. chrysantha.

=== Phytochemistry ===
The plant has been considered a medicinal herb in Mongolia. Considered a "major therapeutic drug" in Asian traditional medicine, it has been used to treat diseases in women, asthma, rheumatism, and cardiovascular diseases. It was also known to inhibit Staphylococcus aureus, one of the bacteria responsible for staphylococcal infections.

In the 21st century, extracts from A. sibirica have been researched for and found to possess antifungal qualities. Extracts showed the presence of chlorogenic acid and caffeic acid. Extractions performed with heat and methanol extracted more of the medically relevant compounds than those performed at room temperature or with other solvents.

== Taxonomy and evolution ==
The Siberian columbine was first described with the binomial Aquilegia sibirica in 1783 within Jean-Baptiste Lamarck's botanical volume for Encyclopédie Méthodique. The plant had been previously described as Aquilegia vulgaris var. sibirica in 1767 within the 12th edition of Systema Naturae by Carl Linnaeus. All 15 of the synonyms of A. sibirica are heterotypic synonyms, ones where the type specimen does not match or they have a different taxonomic rank.

Table of Synonyms
Name	Year	Rank
Aquilegia bicolor Ehrh.	1793	species
Aquilegia grandiflora Patrin ex DC.	1817	species
Aquilegia sibirica var. bicolor Regel	1862	variety
Aquilegia sibirica var. concolor C.A.Mey.	1830	variety
Aquilegia sibirica var. discolor C.A.Mey.	1830	variety
Aquilegia sibirica var. grandiflora DC.	1817	variety
Aquilegia sibirica var. ircutiana Fisch., C.A.Mey. & Avé-Lall.	1846	variety
Aquilegia sibirica var. media Rapaics	1909	variety
Aquilegia sibirica var. stenopetala Regel	1856	variety
Aquilegia speciosa DC.	1817	species
Aquilegia speciosa var. bicolor (Ehrh.) DC.	1817	variety
Aquilegia speciosa var. concolor DC.	1817	variety
Aquilegia vulgaris var. daurica Willd.	1800	variety
Aquilegia vulgaris var. sibirica L.	1767	variety
Aquilegia vulgaris var. speciosa Aiton	1789	variety

Aquilegia species evolved relatively quickly after first appearing during the Late Miocene around 6.9 million years ago in East Asia. Aquilegia species diversified quickly and spread into both Europe and North America before migrating back into Asia. As a result, they are a well-known model system in evolutionary biology but confirming an accurate phylogenetic tree showing the relationships between the species in the genus has proved difficult. A. sibirica, though native to Asia, is closely related to A. vulgaris of Central Europe.

The plant's appearance is very proximate to that of Aquilegia flabellata native to the Japanese Alps. A. sibirica is considered a member of the A. flabellata species complex. (Note: Historically, A. flabellata was considered a blue variety of the Siberian columbine with the homotypic synonyms Aquilegia sibirica var. flatbellata and Aquilegia sibirica var. japonica.) A wild hybrid between A. sibirica and Aquilegia glandulosa, Aquilegia × gubanovii, was identified in Mongolia in 1991.

The clade containing A. sibirica diverged Aquilegia ecalcarata between 4.5 and 6 million years ago, though they remain remain cross-compatible. In 1892, the Siberian columbine was identified as a close relative of the northern North American Aquilegia brevistyla, the smallflower columbine. However, subsequent genetic analysis indicates that A. sibirica is far more closely related to other Eurasian columbines – Aquilegia glandulosa in particular – than to North American columbines.

Crosses between A. sibirica and A. ecalcarata–the only Aquilegia species that lacks nectar spurs on its petals–have been studied to identify the gene responsible for spurred petals. The nectar spurs present in Aquilegia are an unusual evolutionary trait. In order to determine the gene responsible for the trait, a 2020 paper by researchers from the University of California, Santa Barbara, Harvard University, and Stanford University utilized A. sibirica (alongside A. chrysantha and A. formosa) as a spurred Aquilegia taxa to compare against the spurless species. This research identified a gene named POPOVICH (POP) as responsible for cell proliferation during the early stage of spur development. POP appeared at higher levels in the petals of the spurred Aquilegia studied than in A. ecalcarata. (Note: As distinct from Semiaquilegia, a genus in the Ranunculaceae family that resemble Aquilegia but are spurless.)

Aquilegia daingolica is a stabilized ancient hybrid of A. glandulosa, Aquilegia oxysepala, and probably A. sibirica. It is similar in its flowers and fruit aggregates to A. glandulosa and in its dark anthers and black clublike spur tips to A. oxysepala, but the form of its spurs differentiates it from all other Asian forms of Aquilegia.

== Distribution ==
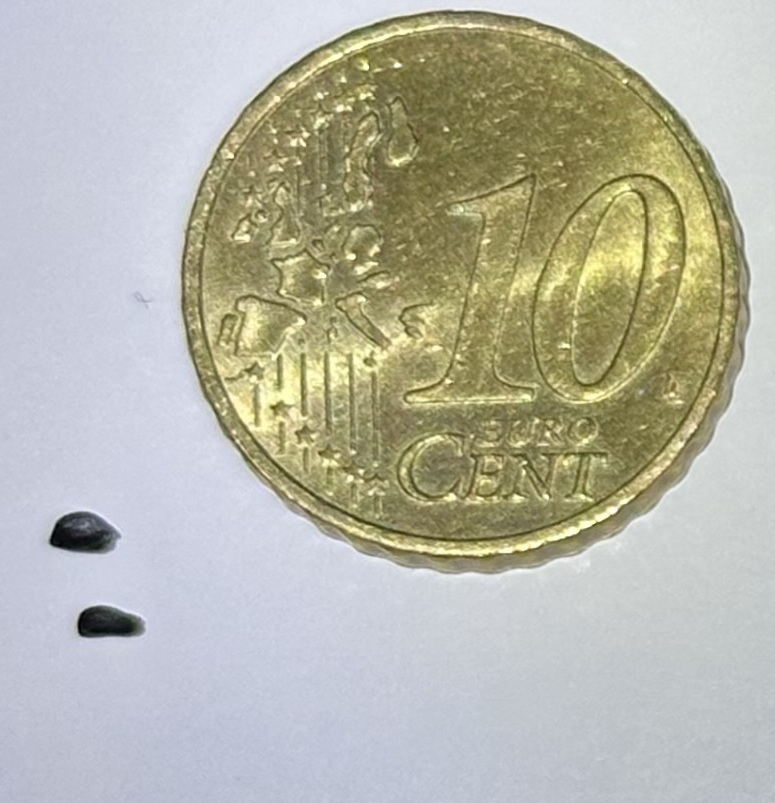
Commercially acquired A. sibirica seeds

The 70 to 80 Aquilegia species are distributed in the Circumboreal Region, ranging between Eurasia and North America. Aquilegia sibirica is native to the north-central Asian regions of Siberia, northern Mongolia, Kazakhstan, and Xinjiang. When considered alongside the distribution of the closely related and similarly lowland species A. vulgaris, A. sibirica's current distribution suggests the possibility of a historical vegetation system that linked Central Europe with Siberia. The population in Middle Siberia is considered a quaternary relict (a population that once possessed a broader range in an earlier geologic epoch).

In open portions of the taiga in the Siberian Sayansky District, Siberian columbines and other vascular plants were found in 1921 to form a dense, two-meter-tall vegetation that can obscure the view of people traversing through these areas. A. sibirica has also been found in the herb layer of the peatlands along Lake Baikal's eastern coast. It generally is found in lower elevation habitats while Aquilegia glandulosa occupies higher areas in roughly the same regions.

=== Cultivation ===
Siberian columbine is cultivated in gardens globally. The flower was introduced to the United States by the United States Department of Agriculture in 1933; these seeds were presented to the United States by A. P. Iljinski, the chief botanist of the Botanic Garden, Leningrad, on behalf of the Soviet Union. (Note: The A. sibirica seeds were given alongside seeds for other plant species, including 12 additional species of Aquilegia.) Finnish research has suggested that A. sibirica is among the Siberian and Far Eastern plants that could prove valuable for northern landscaping. In 1946, the American botanist Philip A. Munz identified that it had been hybridized with A. vulgaris to produce to produce the cultivated hybrid A. ×garnieriana.
