= Aquilegia borodinii =

Scientific classification
- Kingdom: Plantae
- Clade: Tracheophytes
- Clade: Angiosperms
- Clade: Eudicots
- Order: Ranunculales
- Family: Ranunculaceae
- Genus: Aquilegia
- Species: A. borodinii

Binomial name
- Aquilegia borodinii Schischk.

Species of flowering plant

Aquilegia borodinii is a perennial flowering plant in the family Ranunculaceae, native to Siberia and Mongolia.

== Description ==
Aquilegia borodinii is a perennial herb growing to 15–40 cm (6–16 in) tall. It has green, ternate basal leaves and kidney-shaped leaflets with wavy teeth along the edge. The stems have short hairs. The flowers are whitish blue and 2–4 cm (0.8–1.6 in) long, with thin nectar spurs measuring 1.5 cm (0.6 in) in length.

== Distribution and habitat ==
Aquilegia borodinii is native to southern Siberia (Altai Republic, Buryatia, Krasnoyarsk, and Tuva) and northern Mongolia (Bayan-Ölgii and Bulgan provinces). It inhabits scree and rocky areas at altitudes of 1,600–2,500 m (5,200–8,200 ft).

== Conservation ==
As of December 2024, the species has not been assessed for the IUCN Red List.

== Ecology ==
Aquilegia borodinii blooms in summer.
