= Eugène Patrin =

French mineralogist (1742–1815)

Eugène Louis Melchior Patrin (3 April 1742, Lyon – 15 August 1815, Saint-Vallier) was a French mineralogist and naturalist. His botanical abbreviation is: Patrin.

Following two years of travels in Germany, Hungary and Poland, he spent eight years in Russia (Siberia) (1780–87), conducting geological and botanical investigations. He extensively travelled the Urals, the Altai Mountains and other areas of Siberia, with his mineral collections being shipped back to St. Petersburg ahead of his return. This material, however, was partially confiscated by Pyotr Simon Pallas, who kept the best items for his personal cabinet. Patrin's remaining pieces were subsequently offered to the Jardin du Roi collection in Paris, provided that the group not be broken up. In 1804 he was appointed first librarian of the Conseil des mines. From 1790 to 1815, he was a member of the Académie des sciences, belles-lettres et arts de Lyon.

He made important contributions regarding the "mineralogy section" of Buffon's massive work on natural history, "Histoire Naturelle". In 1788 he provided a modern description of aurichalcite, giving it the name Calamine verdâtre. The plant genus Patrinia (family Valerianaceae) was named in his honor by Antoine Laurent de Jussieu.

== Selected works ==
- Relation d'un voyage aux Monts d'Altaice en Sibérie fait en 1781, (1783).
- Mémoire sur ls moeurs des habitants de la Sibérie, (1790).
- Recherches sur les volcans : d'après les principles de la chimie pneumatique, (1800).
- Histoire naturelle des minéraux contenant leur description, celle de leur gîte, la théorie de leur formation, leurs rapports avec la géologie ou histoire de la terre, le détail de leurs propriétés et de leurs usages leur analyse chimque, etc. (1830).
