= Andrey Erst =

Russian botanist

Andrey Sergeevich Erst
- Education: Altai State University
- Scientific career
- Fields: Botany
- Workplaces: Central Siberian Botanic Garden
- Author abbrev. (botany): Erst

Andrey Sergeevich Erst (Russian: Андрей Сергеевич Эрст) is a Russian botanist, who is a senior researcher at the Central Siberian Botanic Garden in Novosibirsk.

== Career ==
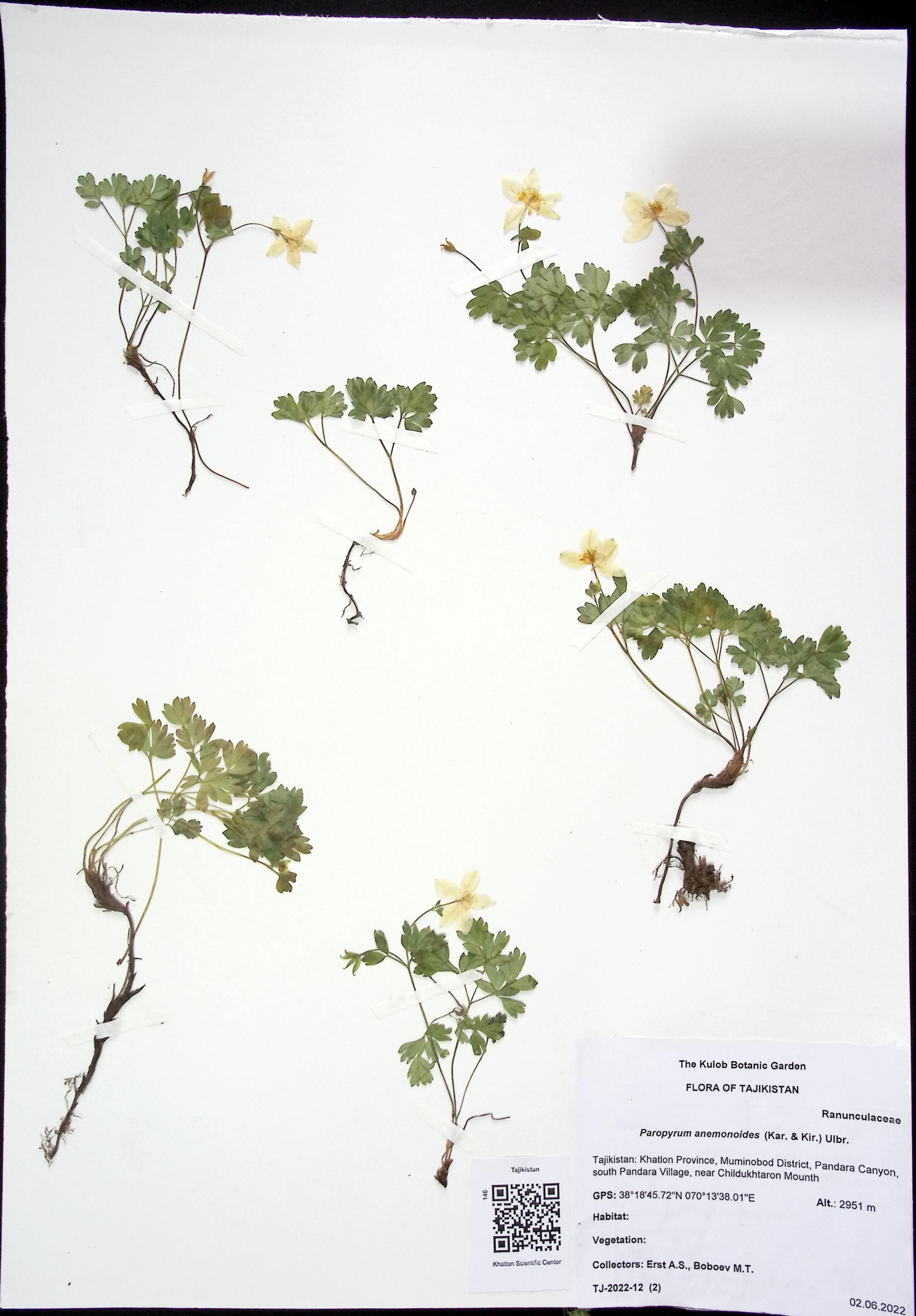
A Paropyrum anemonoides specimen from Tajikistan collected by Erst and M. T. Boboev

Andrey Erst studied at Altai State University from 2000 to 2005 before undertaking postgraduate study at the Central Siberian Botanic Garden, defending his thesis in 2009, on the subject of the genus Ranunculus in the Altai Mountains. Since 2009 he has continued working at the Botanic Garden, becoming a junior researcher in 2009, researcher in 2011, and senior researcher in 2014.

Erst specialises in systematics, floristics (the study of the distribution of plants), molecular biology, and karyology (the study of cell nuclei, especially chromosomes). He is a member of the Novosibirsk Branch of the Russian Botanical Society.

== Legacy ==
The International Plant Names Index lists Erst as the authority for 26 taxa, primarily in the Ranunculaceae, especially Aquilegia species native to Siberia, the Russian Far East, and China.
