= Waterbuses in Novosibirsk =

Part of public transit network in Russia

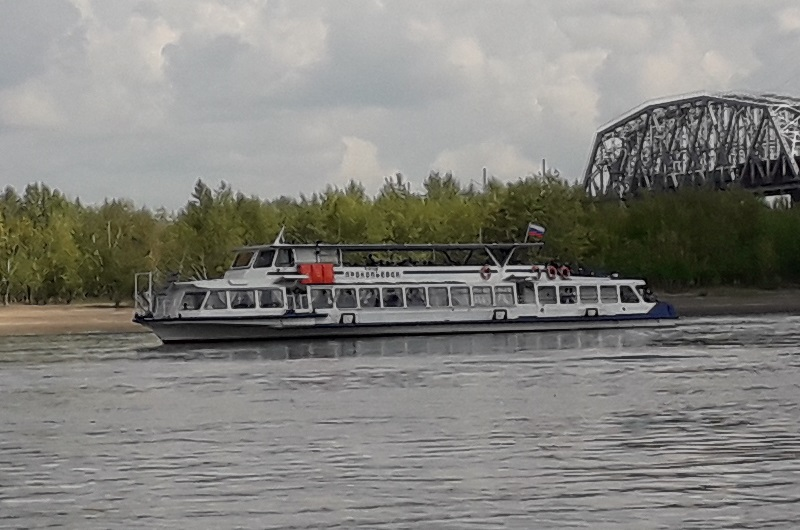
- Waterbus Moskva type proceeding downstream of the Ob on the background of Korablik Island and Komsomolsky Railway Bridge
- Locale: Novosibirsk, Russia
- Waterway: Ob, Novosibirsk Reservoir
- Transit type: Waterbus
- Owner: "Rechflot" (LLC)
- Began operation: 1910
- No. of lines: 3

The Novosibirsk waterbus system (Russian: Новосибирский речной трамвай) is a part of the public transport network of Novosibirsk, Russia.

== History ==
In 1910, the municipal authorities bought the steamship "Novonikolayevsk" for the organisation of a ferry between right and left banks of Ob. In 1919, "Novonikolayevsk" was replaced by the steamship "Brat'ya" ("Brothers"). The ferry was operational until the opening of the Kommunalny Bridge in 1955.

In 1950s-1970s, there was a need to provide transport services between city center and dachas located in the Ob river valley within the city limits. This had given a boost to a development of the city waterbus transport system which reached its peak in the mid-1970s. At that time, Novosibirsk passenger fleet replenished with new hydrofoil boats such as Meteor type, Voskhod type, Raketa type and hydroplane pump-jet boats Zarya type.

Further development of the land passenger transport led to a ridership drop and a reduction of the number of routes of waterbus system.

== Current status ==
Routes of Novosibirsk waterbus are operated by the only one private carrier, which is using displacement decked Moskva type ships. This carrier also serves suburban commuter routes to Berdsk and Sedova Zaimka.

The Novosibirsk waterbus system includes the following routes:

- Novosibirsk River Passenger Terminal – Beach "Bugrinskaya Roshcha" – Korablik Island

This route is the only way to take people to Korablik Island because no other public transport goes to the island. Since 2020, waterbuses, following this route, make intermediate stop at the beach near Bugrinskaya Roshcha.

- Novosibirsk River Passenger Terminal – Severo-Chemskoy residential area – Allotment garden community "Smorodinka" – Allotment garden community "Tikhie Zori"

The route was launched on 1 August 2021. In 2022, the route will be operational since the opening of the period of navigability.

- Novosibirsk River Passenger Terminal – Novosibirsk Waterpark.

The route was launched in 2018. The route was not included in the plan of navigational season 2021 due to suspension of Waterpark's operation.

Usually, the period of navigability is opened in late April or early May and is closed in late September or early October.
