= Korablik Island (Novosibirsk) =

Island in Novosibirsk, Russia

Korablik
Native name: Кораблик
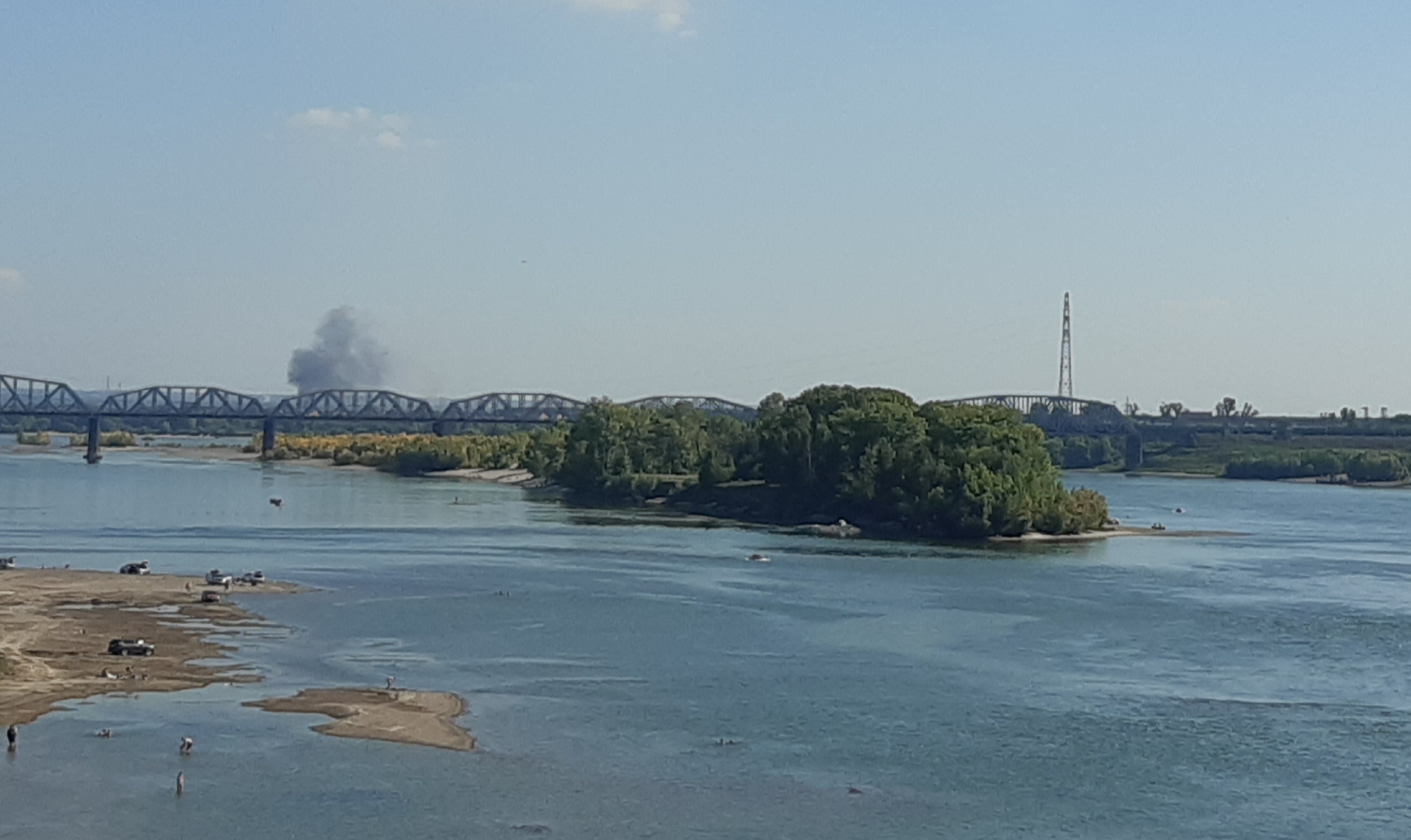
- Interactive map of Korablik

Geography
- Location: Ob River
- Coordinates: 54°57′47″N 82°58′52″E

Administration
- Russia
- City: Novosibirsk

Korablik (Russian: Кораблик) is an island in the Ob River in Pervomaysky District of Novosibirsk, Russia. The Komsomolsky Railway Bridge passes over the island.

== Tourism ==
The Korablik is used for outdoor recreation. A passenger motor ship goes from the Novosibirsk River Station to the island.

== Gallery ==
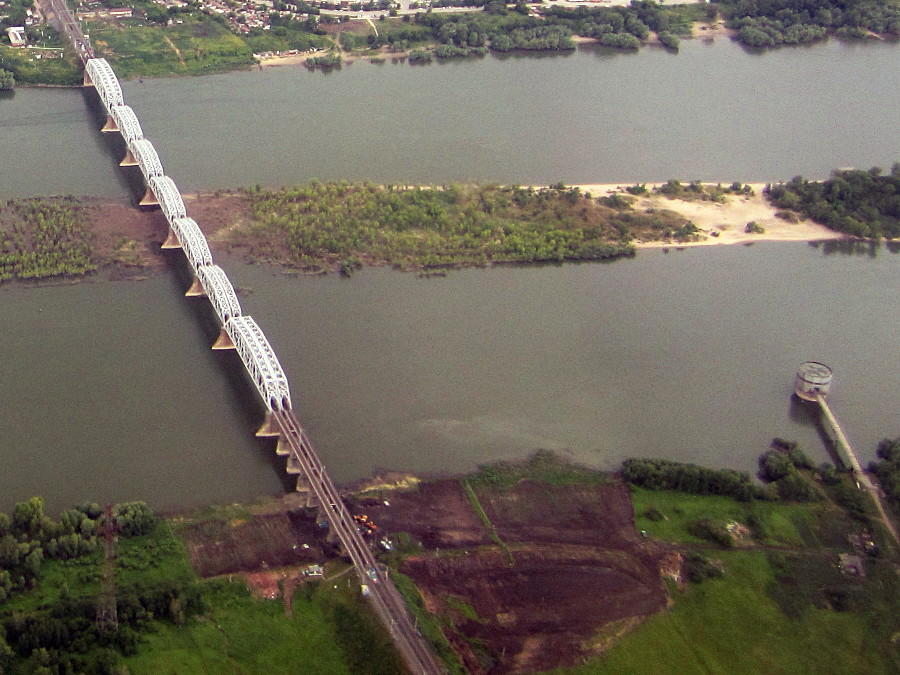

== See also ==
- Kustovoy Island
