= Kustovoy Island =

Island in Russia

Kustovoy
Native name: Кустовой остров
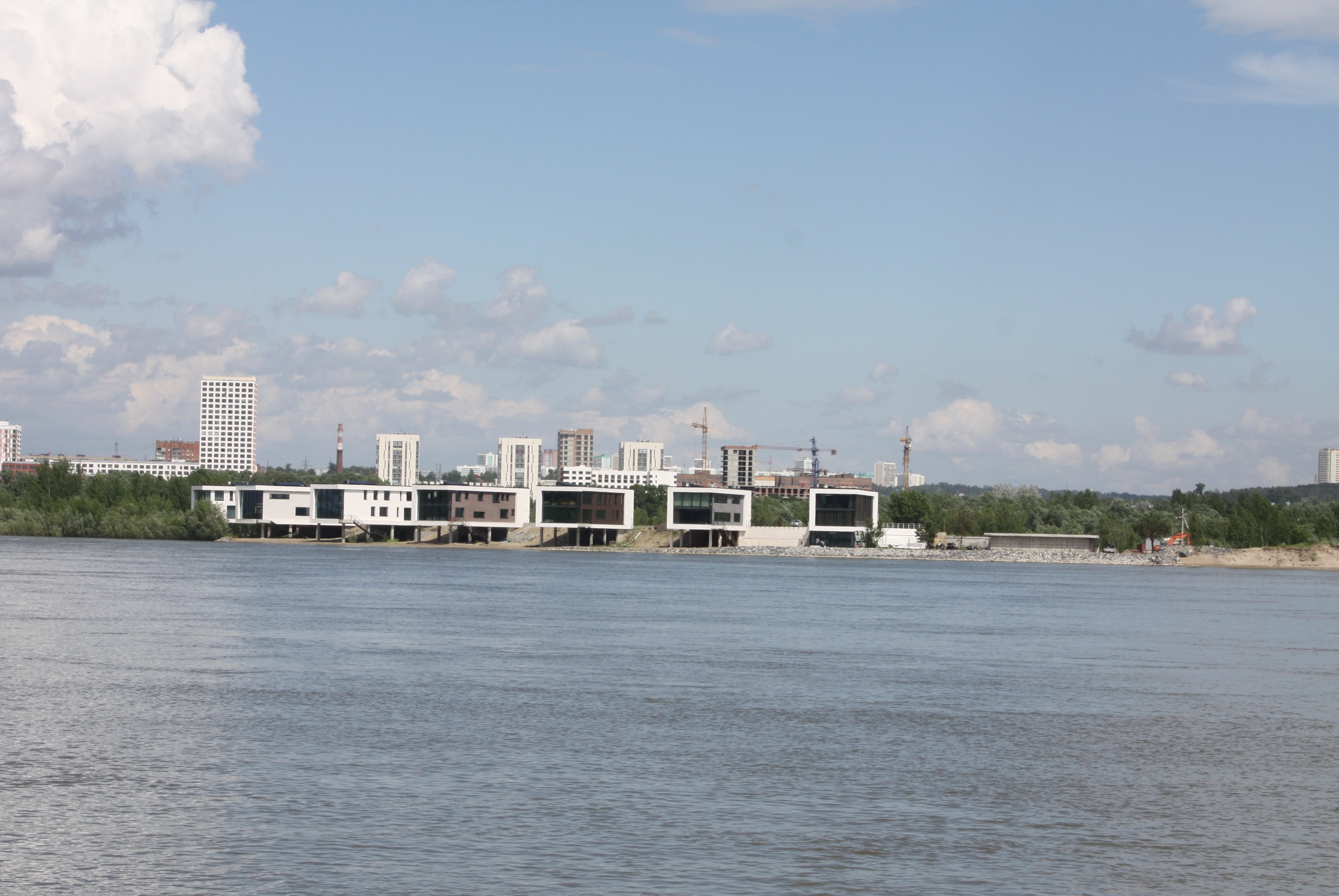
- Interactive map of Kustovoy

Geography
- Location: Ob River
- Coordinates: 54°58′38″N 82°58′14″E

Administration
- Russia
- City: Novosibirsk

Kustovoy Island (Russian: Кустовой остров) is an island in the Ob River in Pervomaysky District of Novosibirsk, Russia. It lies opposite the mouth of the Inya River.

== Buildings and structures ==
In the northern part of the island there is a boat station, which consists of seven buildings.

The Bugrinsky Bridge passes over the island.
