= Novosibirsk Electromechanical College =

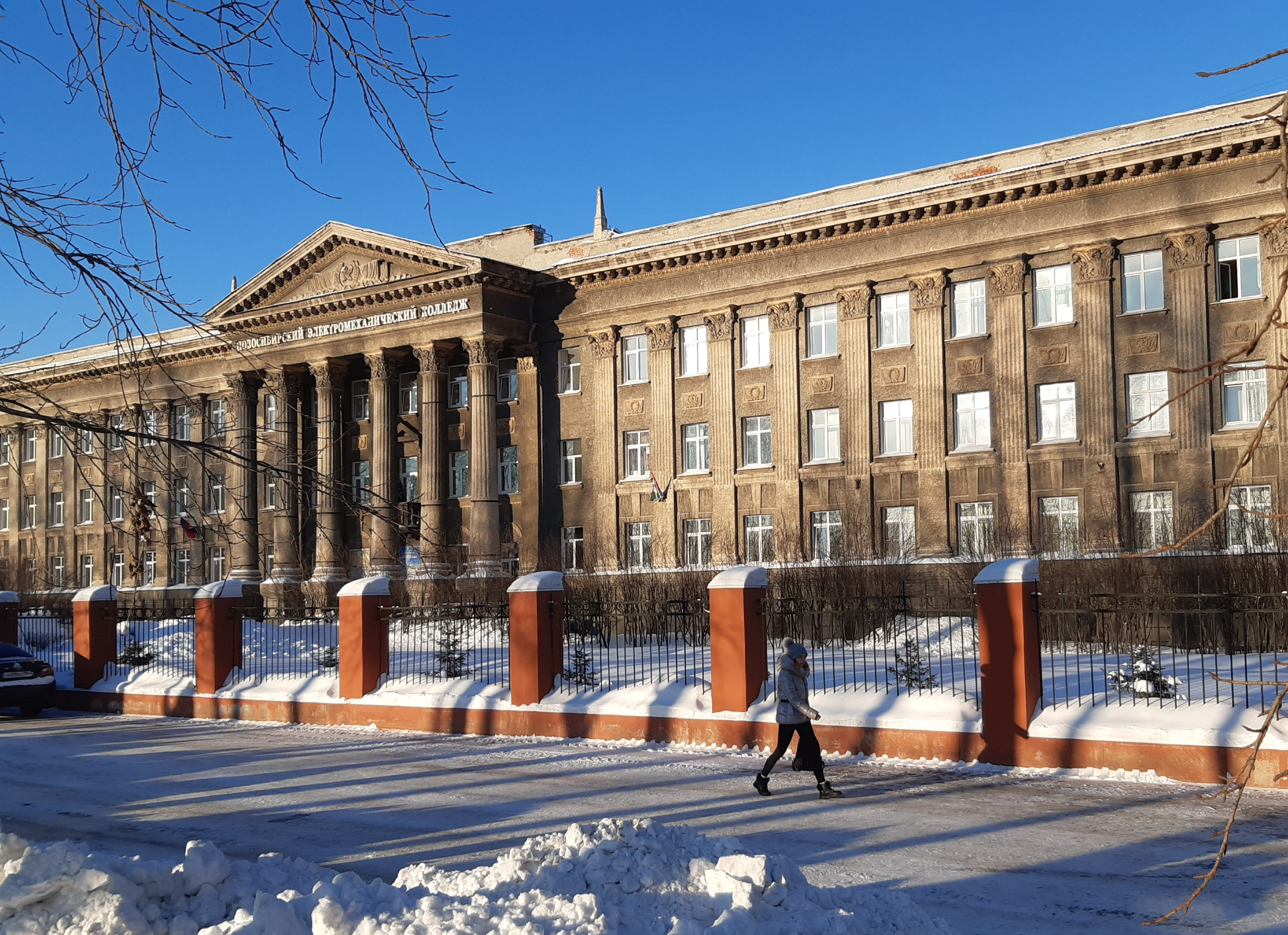

Location
- Novosibirsk, Russia
- Coordinates: 54.9752°N 83.0658°E

Information
- Founded: 1943; 83 years ago

Novosibirsk Electromechanical College (Russian: Новосибирский электромеханический колледж) is an educational institution in Pervomaysky District of Novosibirsk, Russia. It was founded in 1943.

== History ==
The educational institution was opened in 1943 as the Inskoy Technical School of Railway Transport.

In 1954, the school was attached to the Ministry of Transport Construction. In 1955, It was renamed the Inskoy Construction Technical School of Transport Construction.

In 1957, an educational building and a dormitory for 200 people were put into operation.

In 1961, the institution was renamed the Novosibirsk Electromechanical Technical School of Transport Construction. And in 1991, It was named the Novosibirsk Electromechanical College.

== Campus ==
The campus with an area of 0,85 hectares includes the main educational and laboratory buildings with 28 classrooms, 26 laboratories, 4 computer classes, 2 gyms, as well as workshops.

The colledge has a library, its collections include more than 76 000 copies. It has a closed training ground for the training of drivers of category B and C.

The institution also has three dormitories for 840 persons and one canteen for 100 people.

== Graduates ==
Graduates of the educational institution worked at large construction sites in the Soviet Union: Tyumen — Tobolsk — Surgut, Abakan–Taishet, Baikal–Amur Mainline.

== Gallery ==
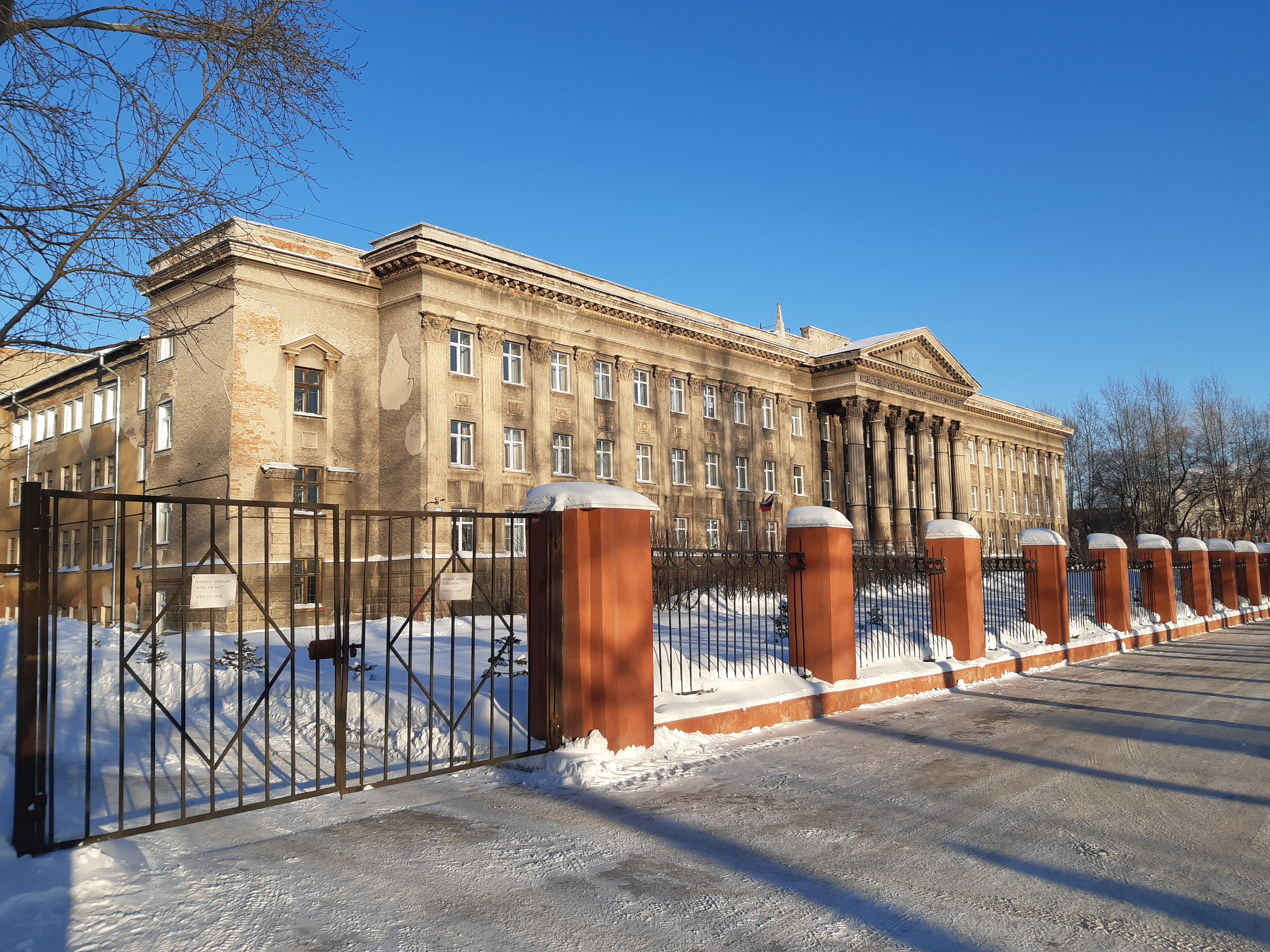

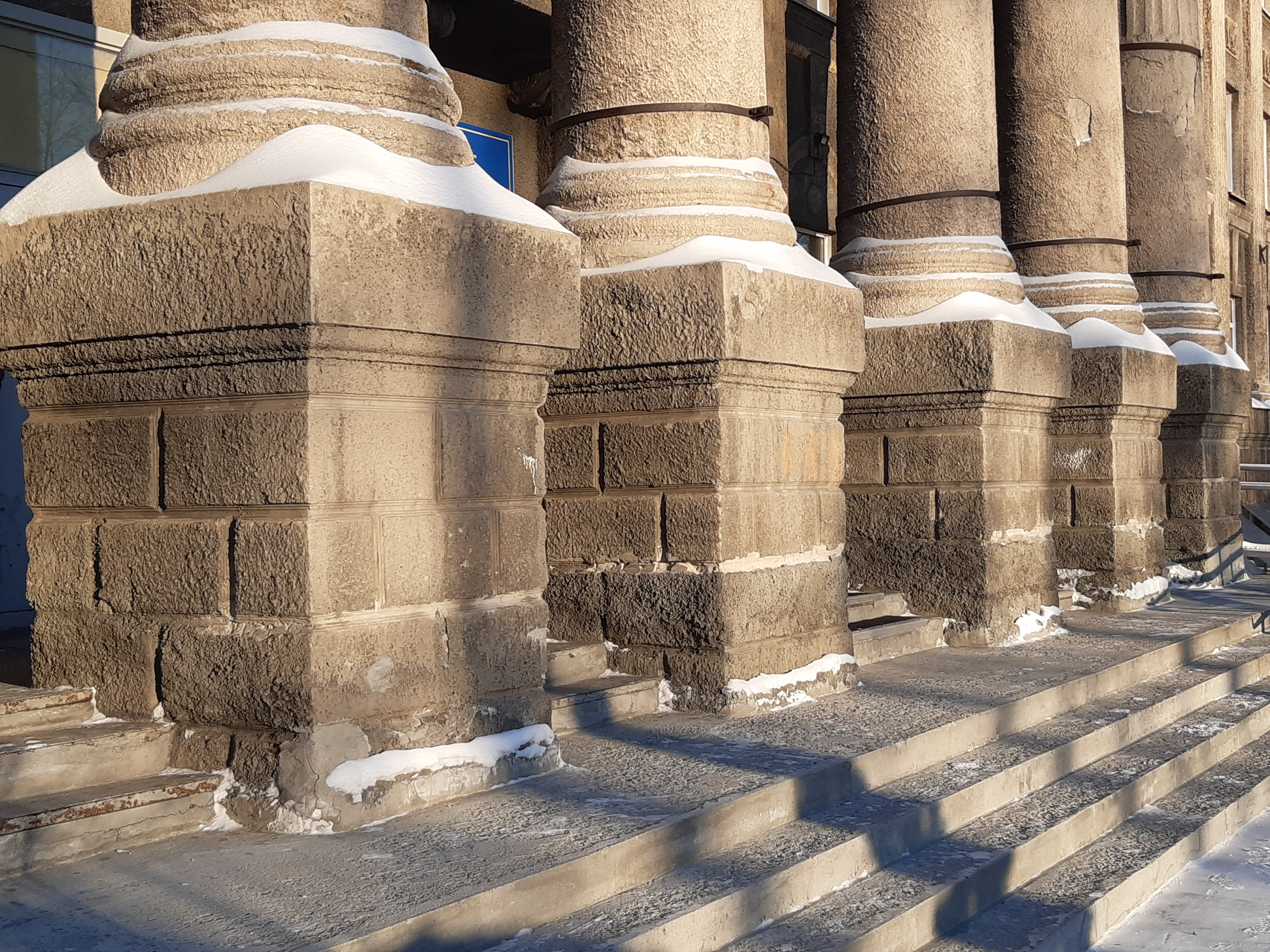

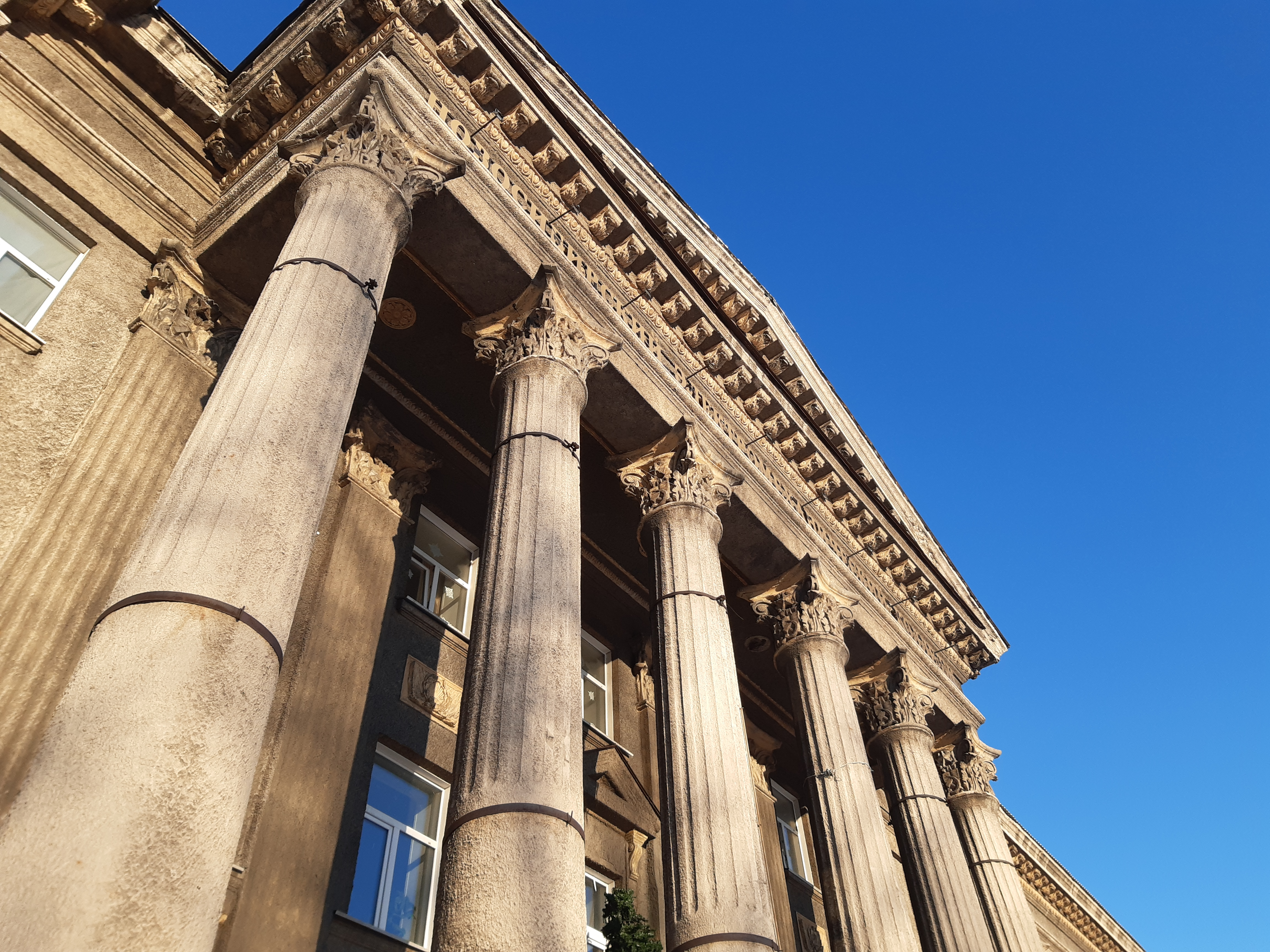

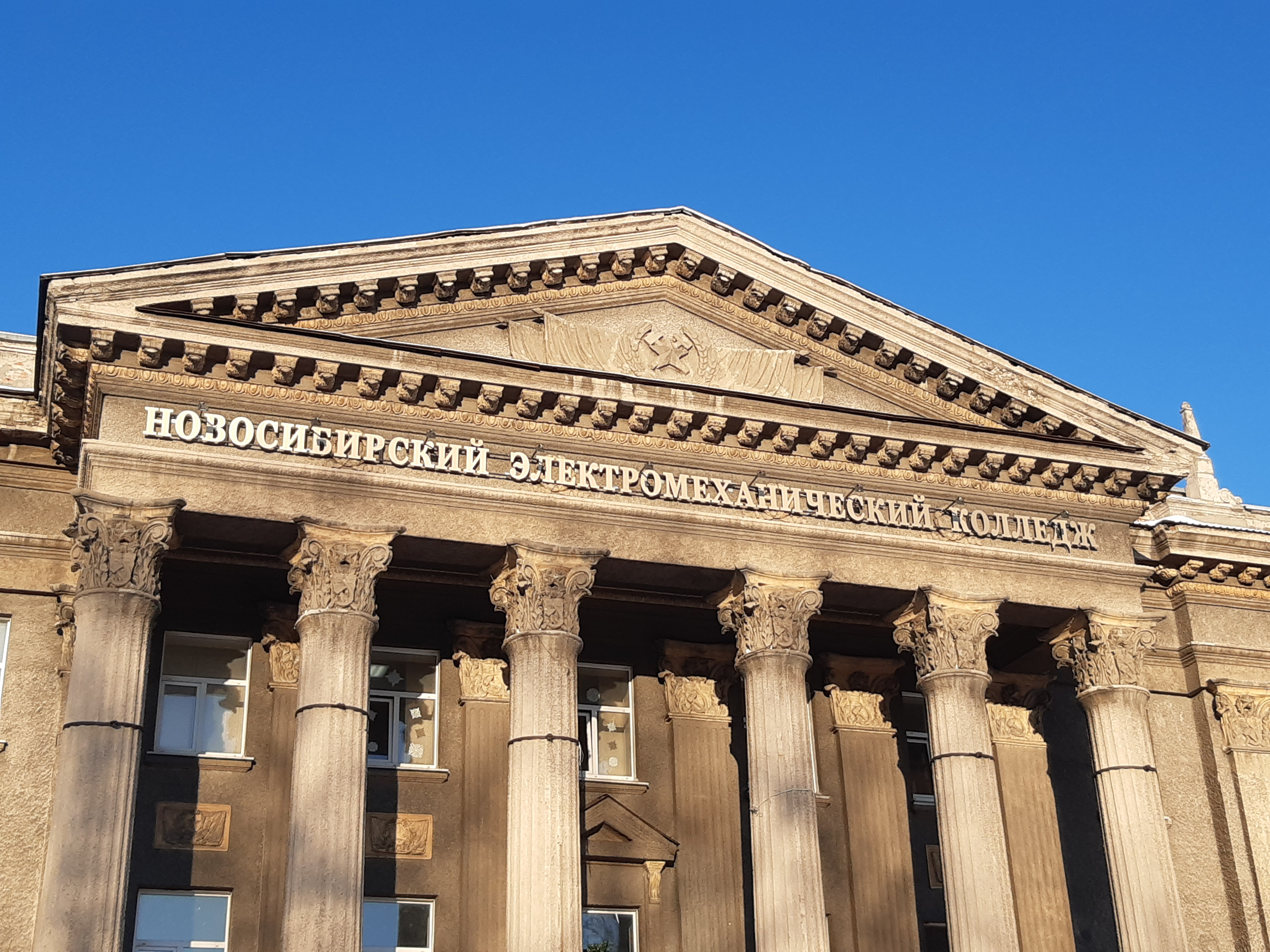

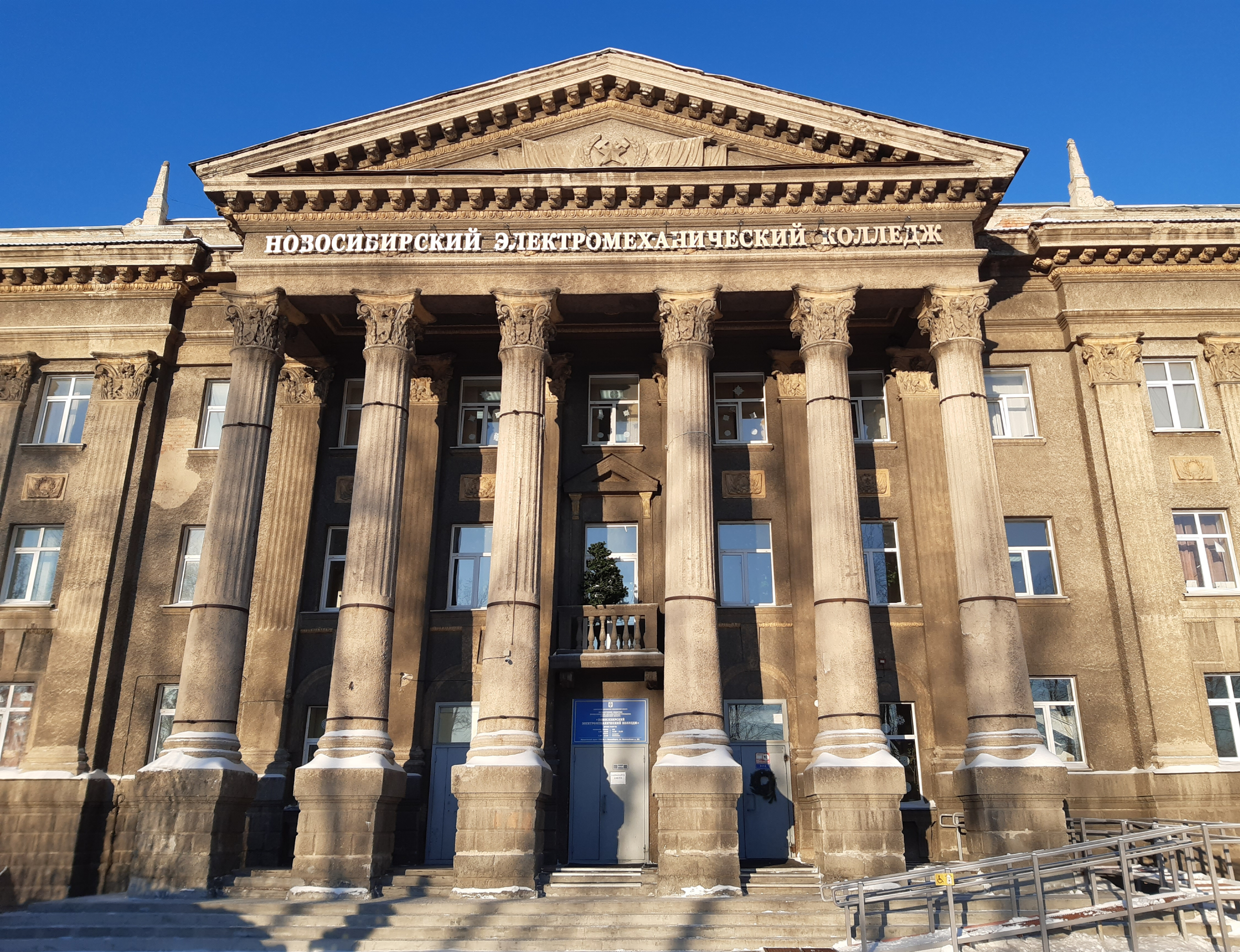
