= Inskaya railway station =

Railway station in Russia

Coordinates: 54°57′46″N 83°07′07″E

Inskaya
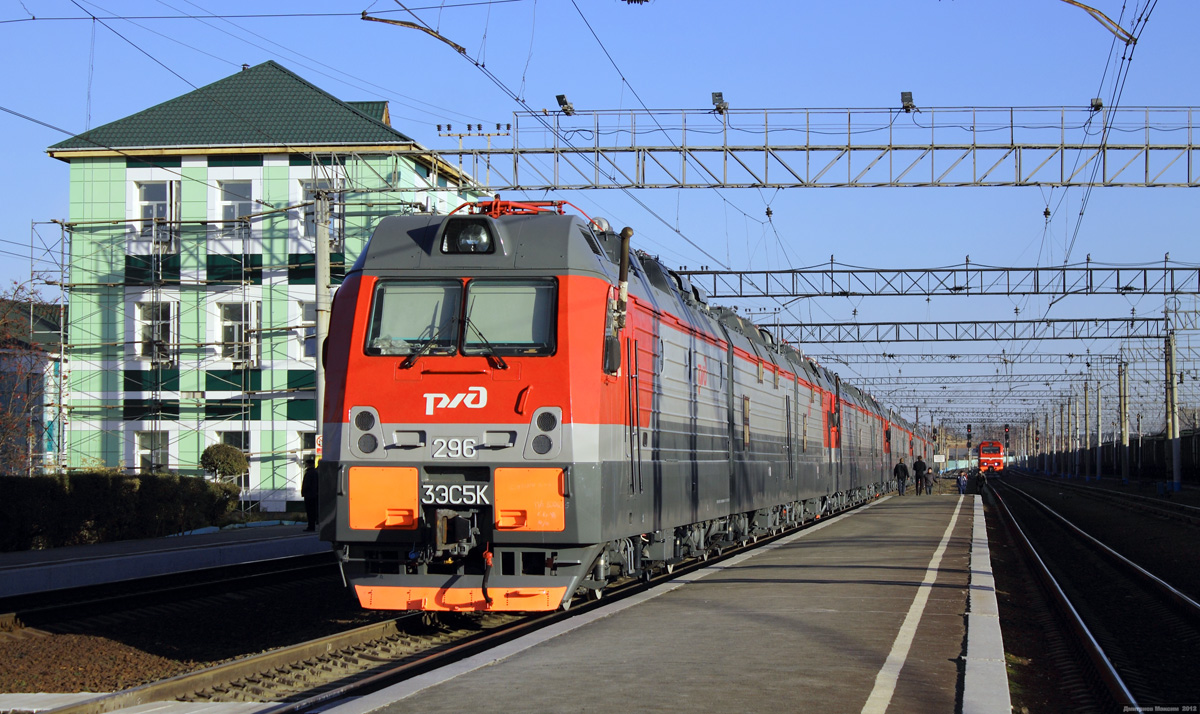

General information
- Location: Russia, Novosibirsk
- Owner: Russian Railways

History
- Opened: 1933
- Former names: Eikhe

Services
Preceding station	West Siberian Railway	Following station
Location

Inskaya railway station is a classification yard, or marshaling yard, located in Pervomaysky City District of Novosibirsk, Russia. It is one of the largest marshaling yards in Russia and the former Soviet Union. It is located on the Ob-Proektnaya railway line which connects the Kuznetsk Basin and the Trans-Siberian Railway. Over 27,000 railway cars pass through the yard daily.
