= Komsomolsky Railway Bridge =

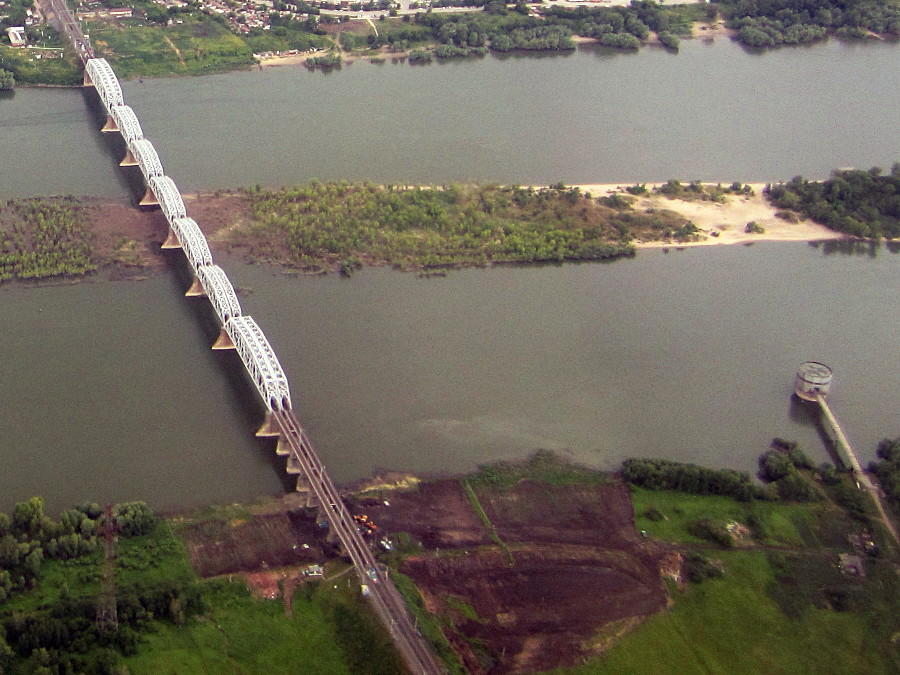
- Coordinates: 54°57′41″N 82°59′06″E
- Crosses: Ob River
- Locale: Novosibirsk, Russia

Characteristics
- Total length: 880 m

History
- Opened: 1931

Location
- Interactive map of Komsomolsky Railway Bridge

The Komsomolsky Railway Bridge (Russian: Комсомольский железнодорожный мост, Komsomolsky Zheleznodorozhny Most) is a bridge over the Ob River, connecting the Kirovsky and Pervomaysky districts of Novosibirsk, Russia. It was built in 1930–1931.

The second railway bridge across the Ob River in the system of the Trans-Siberian Railway.

== History ==
Construction of the bridge started in December 1930.

It was opened on October 18, 1931.

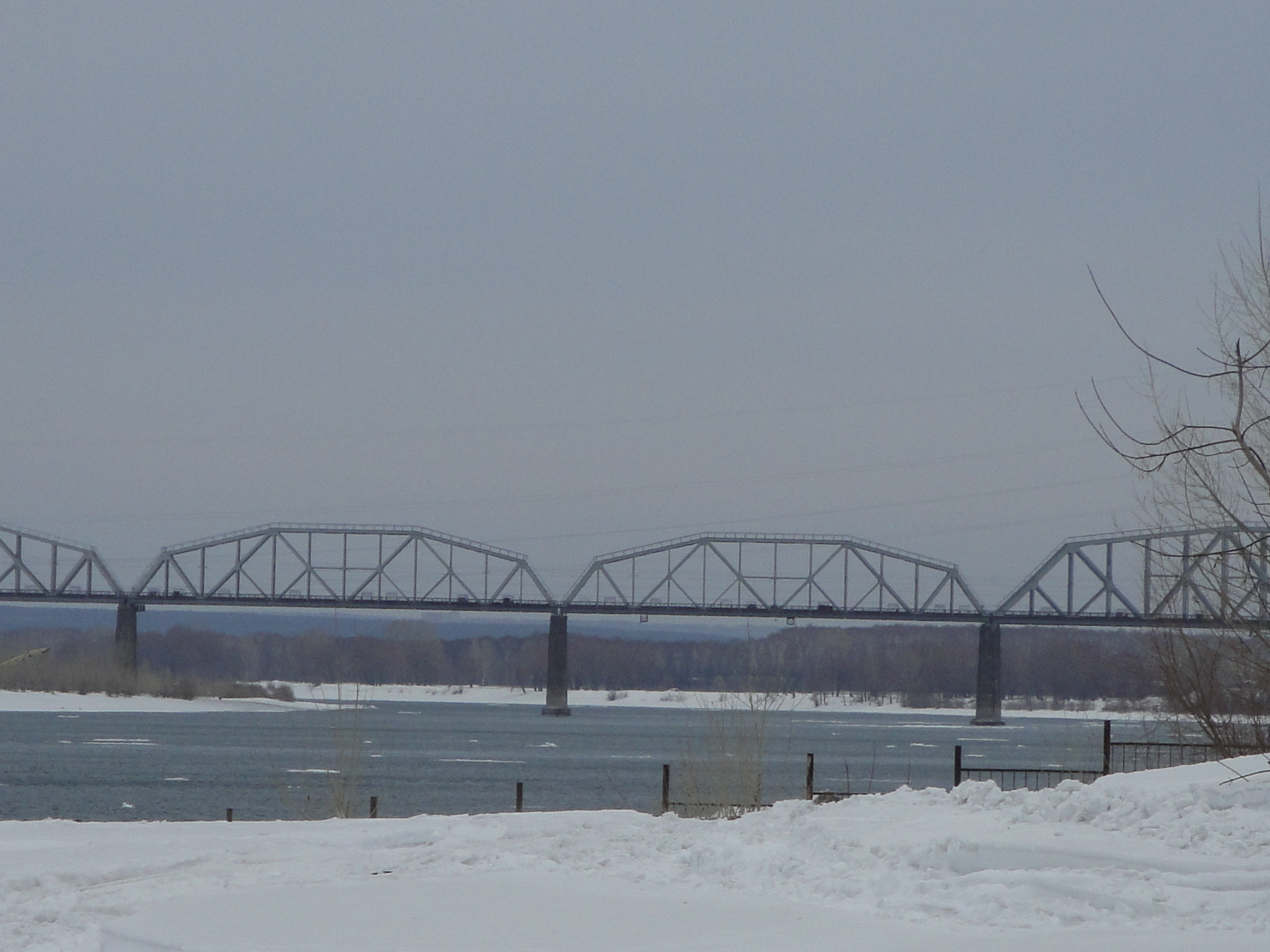
