= Pervomaysky District, Novosibirsk =

Pervomaysky District Первомайский район (Russian)
- District
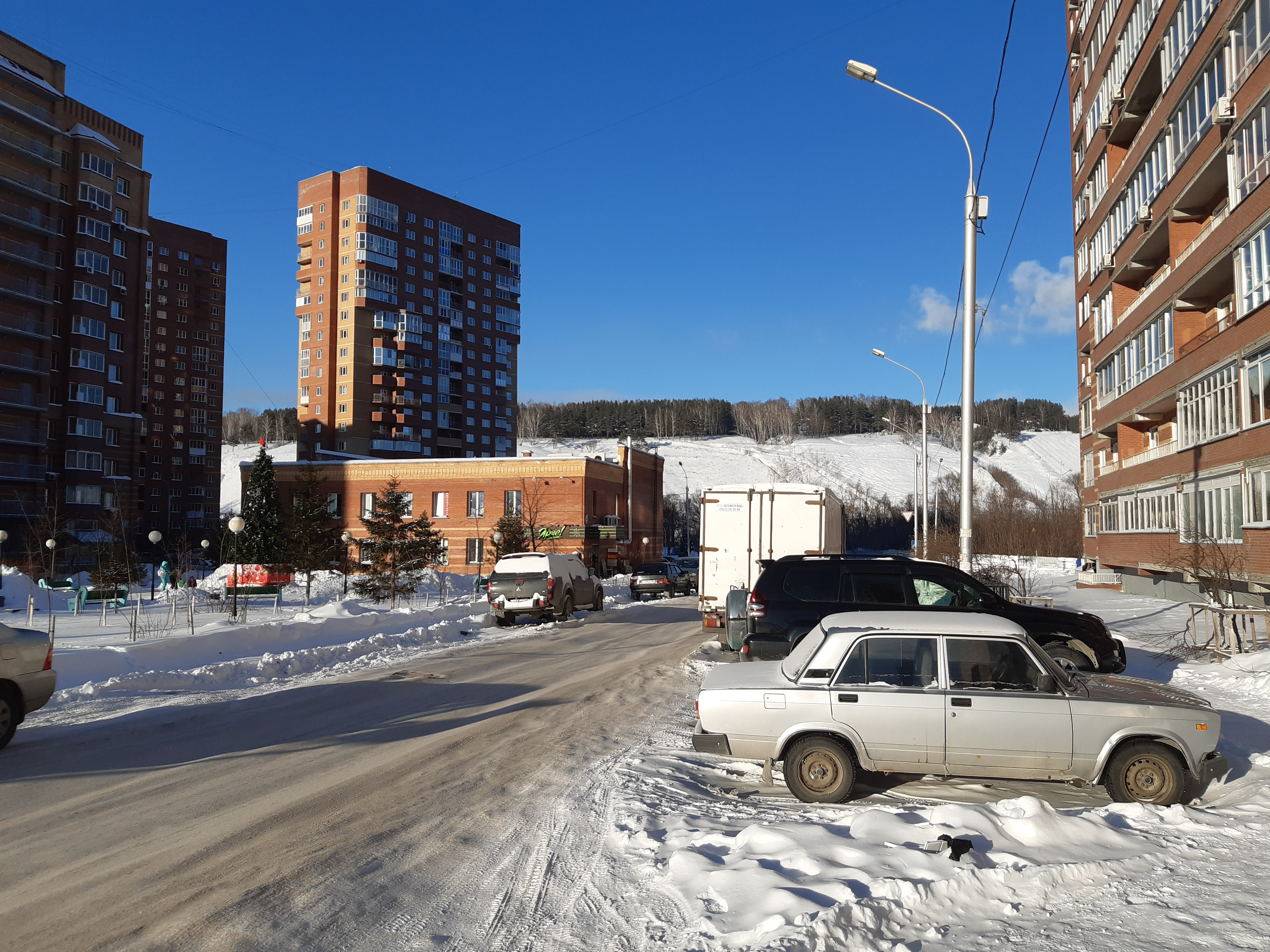

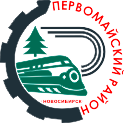
- Coat of arms
- Location of Pervomaysky City District
- Coordinates: 54°56′00″N 83°04′00″E
- Country: Russia
- Federal subject: Novosibirsk
- Established: 20 September 1933

Area
  - Total: 68.28 km^{2} (26.36 sq mi)

Pervomaysky District (Russian: Первомайский район) is an administrative district (raion), one of the 10 raions of Novosibirsk, Russia. The area of the district is 68.28 square kilometres (26.36 sq mi). Population: 87,912 (2018 Census).

== History ==
In 1933, the Eikhovsky District was established. It arose with the construction of the Eikhe Railway Station.

In 1938, Eikhovsky District was renamed the Pervomaysky District.

== Microdistricts ==
- KSM Microdistrict
- Vesenny Microdistrict

== Parks ==
- Pervomaysky Park
- Detsky Park

== Education ==
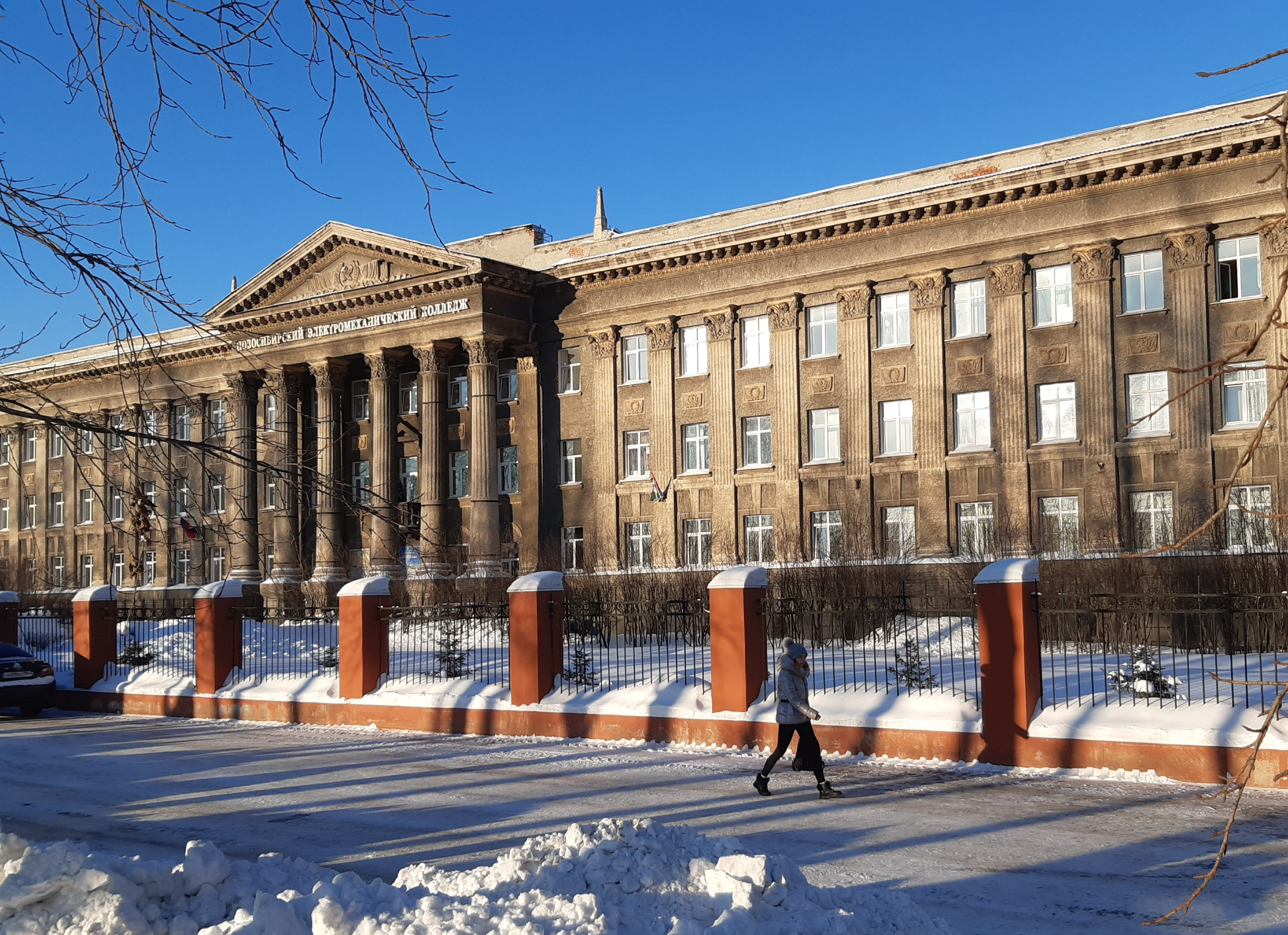
Novosibirsk Electromechanical College

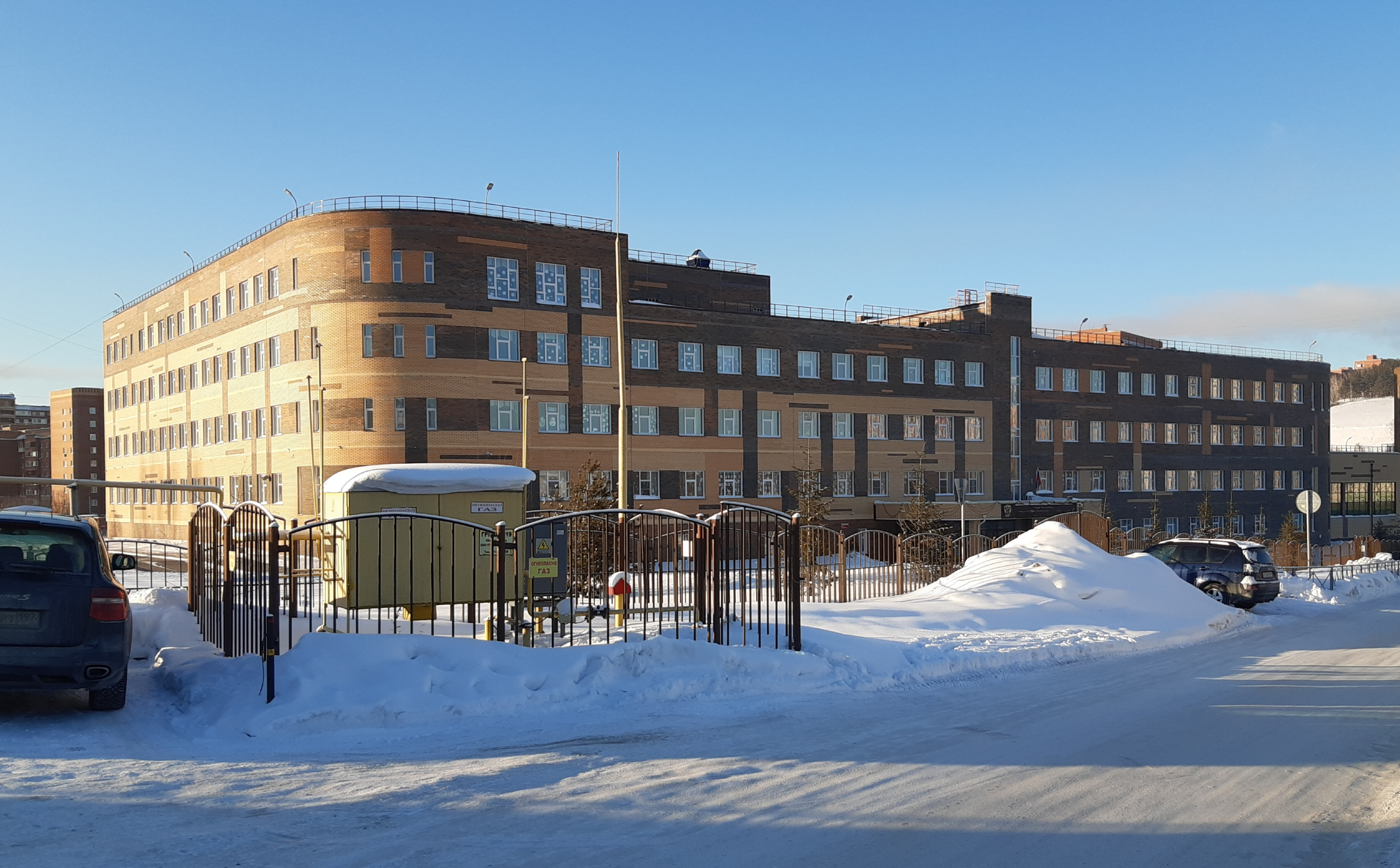
School No. 214 named after Elizaveta Glinka

- Novosibirsk Electromechanical College is an educational institution opened in 1943.

== Cemeteries ==
- Pervomayskoye Cemetery of Prisoners of War is a cemetery of German prisoners of war restored by the German War Graves Commission. The reestablished cemetery was opened on November 19, 1995.
- Inskoye Cemetery
- Staroye Cemetery

== Sports ==
- Pervomayets Combat Sports Club, it was founded by workers of the Novosibirsk Electric Locomotive Repair Plant in 1965.
- Lokomotiv Stadium

== Economy ==
=== Industry ===
- Novosibirsk Electric Locomotive Repair Plant
- Novosibirsk Switch Plant
- Novosibirsk Metal Cutting Plant is a manufacturer company based in 2015.

== Transportation ==
=== Railway ===
Nine railway stations are located in the district: Razyezd-Inya, Novogodnyaya, Pervomayskaya, Inskaya, Sibirskaya, Zvyozdnaya, Rechport, Matveyevka, Yunost.

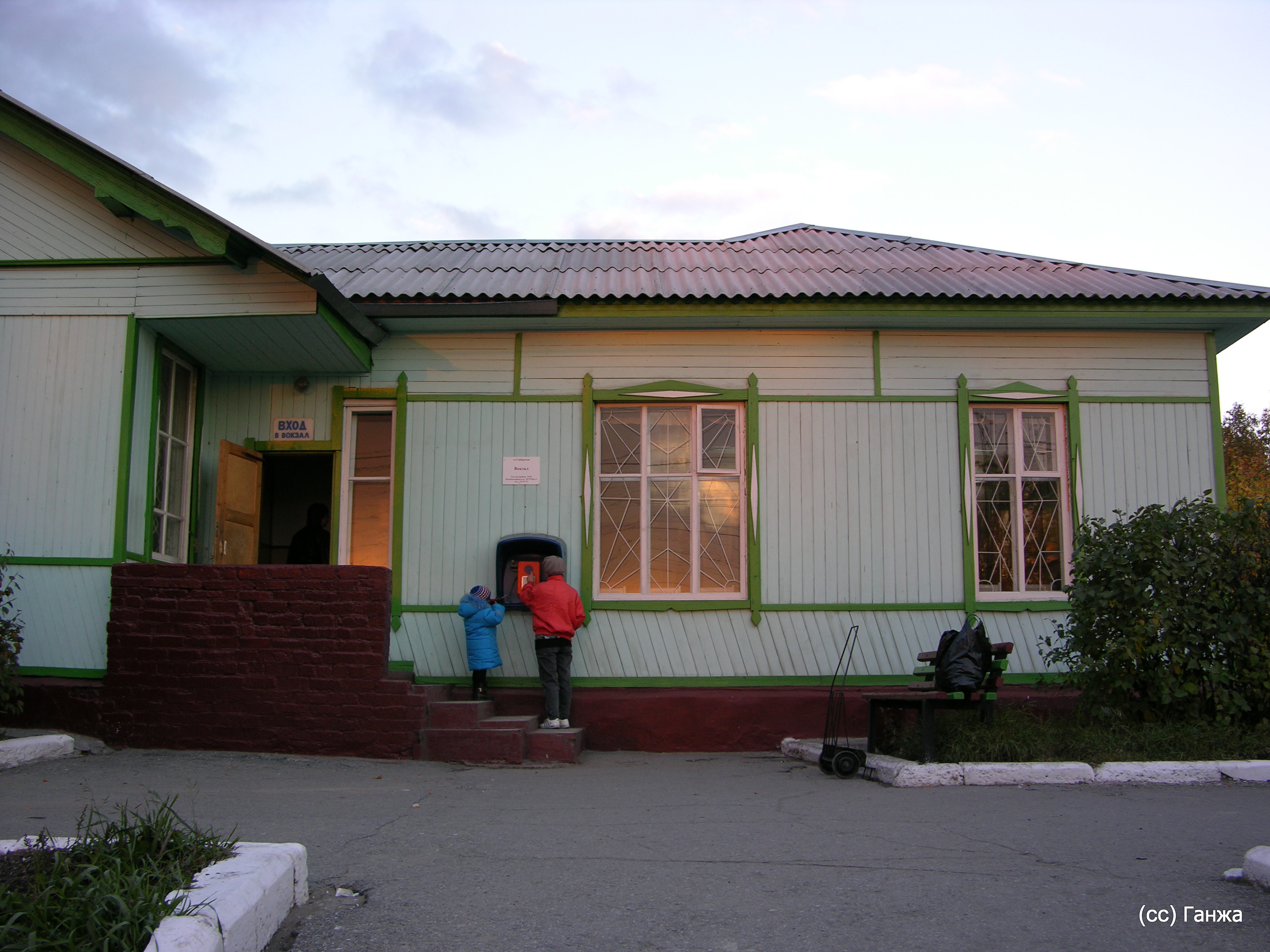
Sibirskaya in 2004

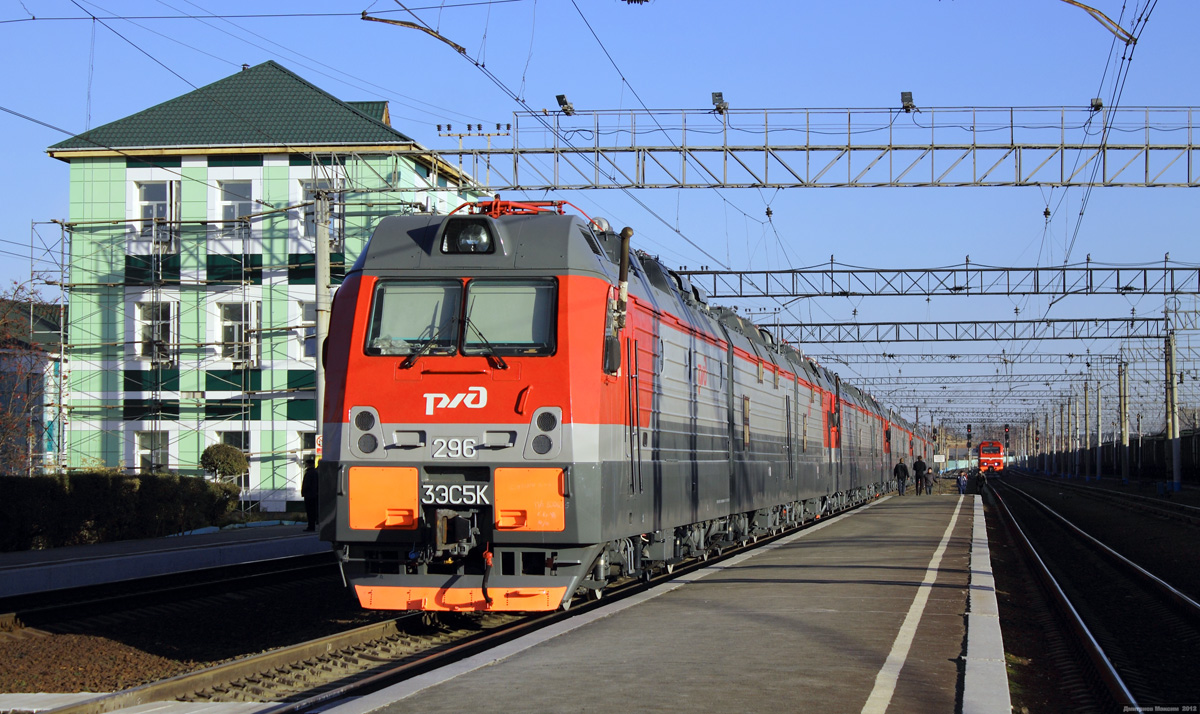
Inskaya

== Notable residents ==
- Vladimir Gorodetsky (born 1948) is a Russian politician, the former mayor of Novosibirsk, the governor of Novosibirsk Oblast from 2014 to 2017.
