= Ikarus 256 =

High-floor coach/bus, made by Hungarian manufacturer Ikarus

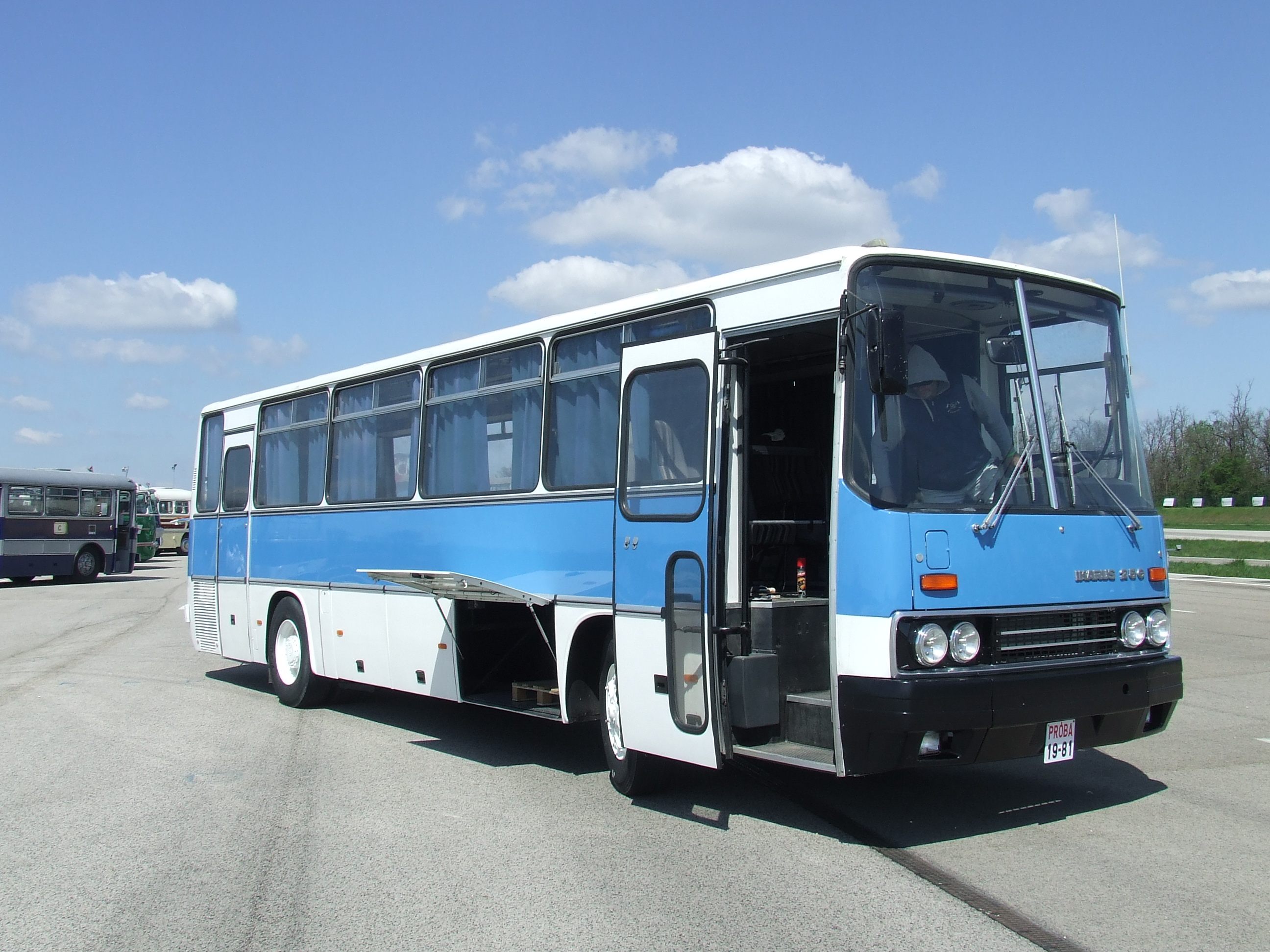

Overview
- Manufacturer: Ikarus

Body and chassis
- Doors: Two
- Floor type: High-floor
- Chassis: Semi-self-supporting
- Related: Ikarus 250

Powertrain
- Engine: Rába-MAN D 2156 (Diesel, Straight 6)
- Power output: 141 kW
- Transmission: 5-speed synchromesh gearbox 6+1-speed synchromesh gearbox

Dimensions
- Wheelbase: 5,330 mm (209 7/8 in)
- Length: 10,990 mm (432 5/8 in)
- Width: 2,500 mm (98 3/8 in)
- Height: 3,080 mm (121 1/4 in)
- Kerb weight: 10,400 kg (22,900 lb)

Chronology
- Predecessor: Ikarus 55
- Successor: Ikarus C56

The Ikarus 256 is a high-floor bus used as a coach for long-distance service and for interurban traffic. It was made from 1977–1989, alongside the larger Ikarus 250, by the Hungarian bus manufacturer Ikarus.

== Technical description ==
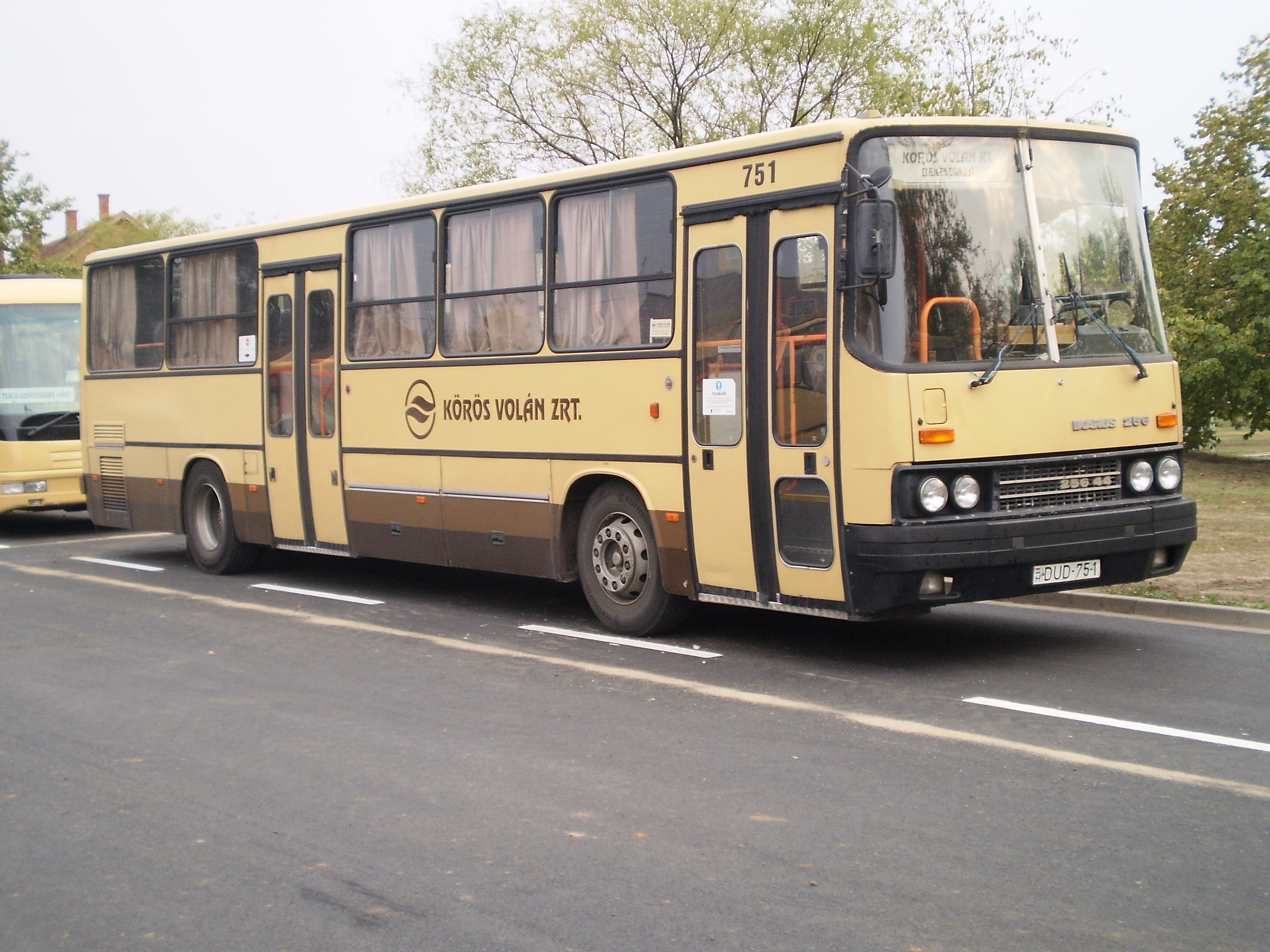
Ikarus 256 bus in Orosháza, Hungary in October 2009

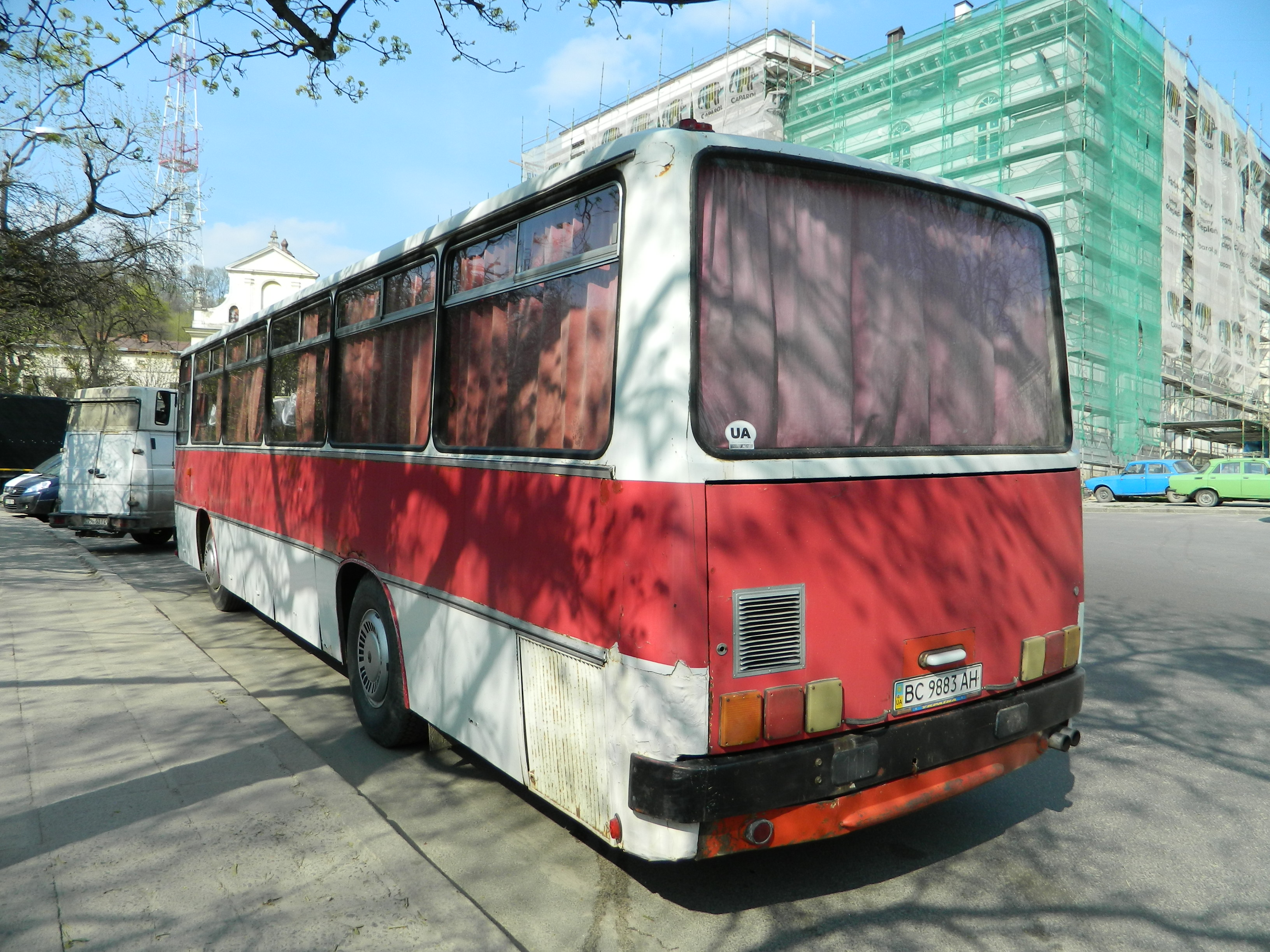
Ikarus 256 rear

Designed as a high-floor two-axle bus, the Ikarus 256 has a semi-self supporting body, with the engine installed under the floor at the back, following the configuration pioneered in West Germany by Setra in the 1950s and 1960s. The body platform incorporates two airsprung beam axles, with the rear axle being a planetary axle. The axles have two hydraulic shock absorbers each. Twin tyres are fitted on the rear axle and single tyres on the front axle. Their size is 10–20″. The steering system is a hydraulically assisted ball-and-nut steering system. In total, the bus has three different braking systems: A pneumatic dual-circuit braking system, an exhaust braking system and a spring-loaded parking brake.

An MAN D 2156 engine, built under licence by Rába, powers the bus. It is a straight six-cylinder, naturally aspirated, liquid-cooled, diesel engine with direct injection, displacing 10.35 litres (632 cu in). The rated power (DIN 70020) is 192 PS (141 kW; 189 hp), the rated torque (DIN 70020) 71 kp⋅m (696 N⋅m). The torque is transmitted to a fully synchronised five-speed gearbox via a single-disc dry-clutch; a six-plus-one-speed gearbox was also available as a factory option. With the default five-speed gearbox, the bus can reach a top speed of 106 km/h. It seats up to 45 passengers.

== Bibliography ==
- Werner Oswald: Kraftfahrzeuge der DDR. 2nd edition. Motorbuch-Verlag, Stuttgart 2000, ISBN 3-613-01913-2, p. 313
