= Ikarus 250 =

High-floor bus/coach manufactured by Ikarus

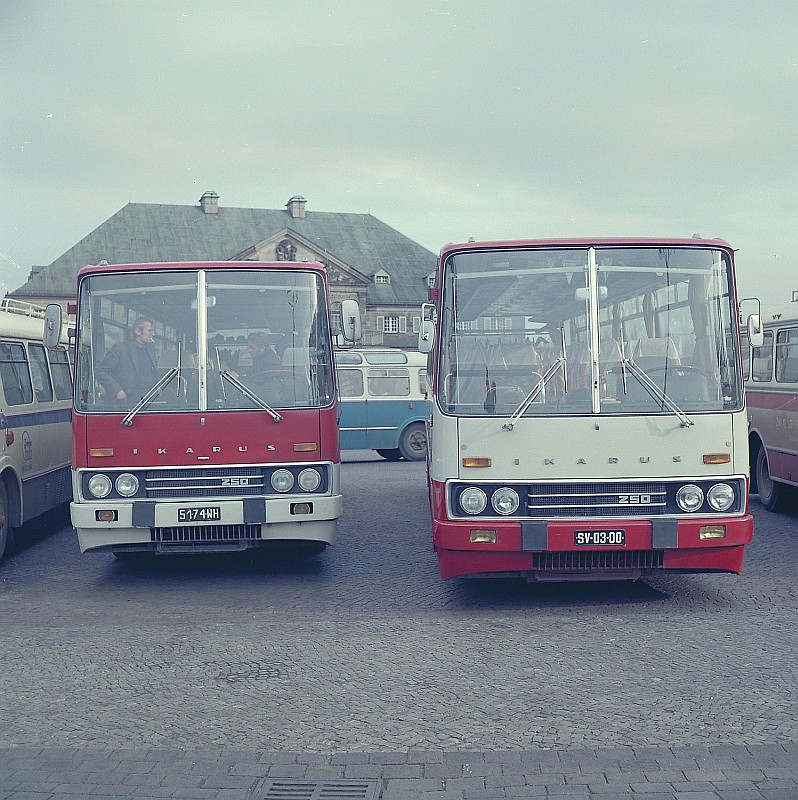
- Two Ikarus 250 in Dresden, 1972

Overview
- Manufacturer: Ikarus

Body and chassis
- Doors: Two
- Floor type: High-floor
- Chassis: Semi-self-supporting
- Related: Ikarus 256 Ikarus 259

Powertrain
- Engine: Rába-MAN D 2156 (Diesel, Straight 6)
- Power output: 141 kW (189 hp)
- Transmission: 5-speed or 6-speed synchromesh gearbox

Dimensions
- Wheelbase: 6,300 mm (248 in)
- Length: 12,000 mm (472 1/2 in)
- Width: 2,500 mm (98 3/8 in)
- Height: 3,210 mm (126 3/8 in)
- Kerb weight: 10,700 kg (23,600 lb)

Chronology
- Predecessor: Ikarus 55
- Successor: Ikarus 150

The Ikarus 250 is a high-floor bus used as a coach for long-distance service. It was made from 1968–1989, alongside the smaller Ikarus 256, by the Hungarian bus manufacturer Ikarus.

== Technical description ==
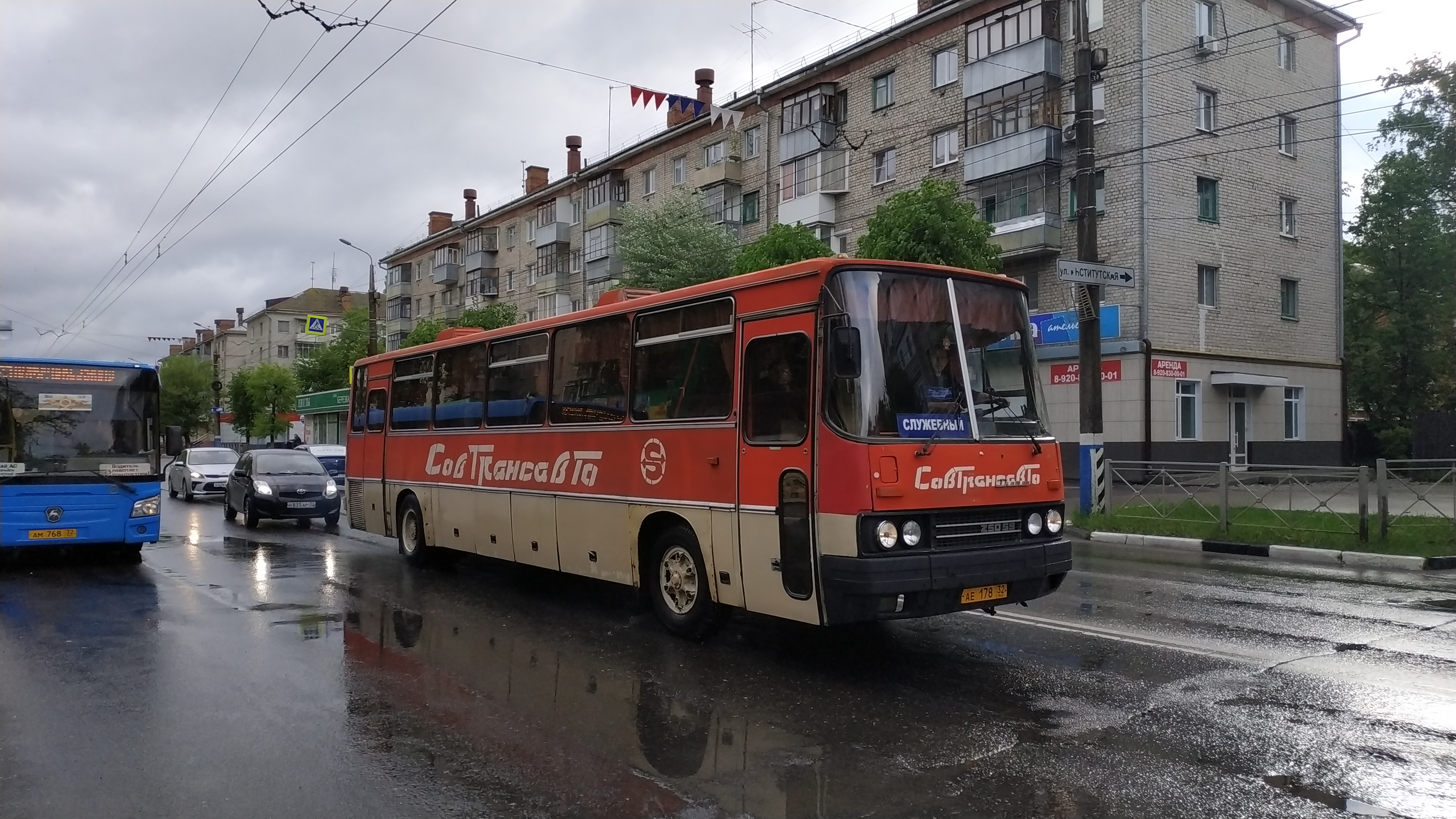
Ikarus 250 in 2019

Designed as a high-floor two-axle bus, the Ikarus 250 has a semi-self supporting body, with the engine installed under the floor at the back, following the configuration pioneered in West Germany by Setra in the 1950s and 1960s. The body platform incorporates two airsprung beam axles, with the rear axle being a planetary axle. The axles have two hydraulic shock absorbers each. Twin tyres are fitted on the rear axle, whilst single tyres are fitted on the front axle. Their size is 10–20 in (254–508 mm). The steering system is a hydraulically assisted ball-and-nut steering system. The bus has three different braking systems: A pneumatic dual-circuit braking system, an exhaust braking system and a spring-loaded parking brake.

An MAN D 2156 engine, built under licence by Rába, powers the bus. It is a straight six-cylinder, naturally aspirated, liquid-cooled, Diesel engine with direct injection, displacing 10.35 litres (632 cu in). The rated power (DIN 70020) is 192 PS (141 kW; 189 hp), the rated torque (DIN 70020) 71 kp⋅m (696 N⋅m). The torque is transmitted to a fully synchronised five-speed gearbox via a single-disc dry-clutch; a six-plus-one-speed gearbox was also available as a factory option. With the default five-speed gearbox, the bus can reach a top speed of 106 km/h (66 mph). It seats between 42 and 46 passengers.

== Bibliography ==
- Werner Oswald: Kraftfahrzeuge der DDR. 2nd edition. Motorbuch-Verlag, Stuttgart 2000, ISBN 3-613-01913-2, p. 313
