= Successors to Ikarus (Hungarian company) =

Successors to the Hungarian company Ikarus are all those companies, created after 2003 and sooner or later started producing vehicles under the brand of the original company.

== Background ==
Ikarus is a bus manufacturer based in Budapest and Székesfehérvár, Hungary, established in 1949 (established in the communist era). Ikarus later became a prominent factory in Hungary and was able to dominate most of the Eastern Bloc countries' markets. In 2003, due to numerous financial struggles and a change in ownership, the company was shut down. Ikarus was outlived by one of its subsidiaries called Ikarus EAG, but it was also shut down in 2007 by the then parent company Irisbus.

The last chairman of the main company Ikarus, was called Gábor Széles. Under his leadership, Ikarus was sold to Irisbus. Széles, a successful businessman and close partner of the Hungarian government increased his wealth while the company slid towards bankruptcy. In 1998, Széles bought some of the shares from the Hungarian state and in return promised to provide work for the companies' employment for the next ten years or otherwise he'll have to pay back hundreds of millions of forints to the state.

Since 2003, Széles has constantly tried reviving the Hungarian bus manufacturing, without any major success.

== Hungarian Bus Kft. ==
Hungarian Bus Kft.
- Company type: Ltd.
- Industry: Bus manufacturing
- Founded: 2003
- Founders: Gábor Széles
- Defunct: 2007
- Headquarters: Székesfehérvár, Hungary
- Area served: Hungary
- Products: Buses

After only two months since the shut down of Ikarus in 2003, Széles established a new company called Hungarian Bus Kft. and promised to start producing new vehicles. Yet the production did not start until 2007. In this company 50% share belonged to Széles' other company called Műszertechnika Holding Rt. The latter managed to buy back the factory in Székesfehérvár and the rights to produce buses from Irisbus, but not the brand.

The "new" vehicle was heavily based on the Ikarus C56 model, which was basically an Ikarus 256 and therefore 30 years old construction with modern design. The model was called IK HB 122L, in which "IK" refers to "Ikarus". It was Széles' way to bypass the agreement with Irisbus. After all, Hungarian Bus only managed to build five units and in 2007 it already ceased to exist. Széles has been widely criticized for only creating the company to avoid paying back an enormous amount of money to the state as compensation for his unfulfilled promise.

== Magyar Autóbuszgyártó Kft. ==
Magyar Autóbuszgyártó Kft.
- Company type: Ltd.
- Industry: Bus manufacturing
- Founded: 2010
- Headquarters: Szigethalom, Hungary
- Area served: Hungary
- Products: Buses

=== Auto Rad Controlle Kft. ===
The Auto Rad Controlle Kft. or ARC, was originally established in 1989 and was serving as one of the many suppliers of Ikarus. Later on, they started to repair autobuses and in 2005 they developed and produced their first vehicle the ARC 187, an 18,75 metres long 5-doored, articulated bus. The company soon released two other models, the ARC 127 and 134, as well.

=== Széles and his proposal ===
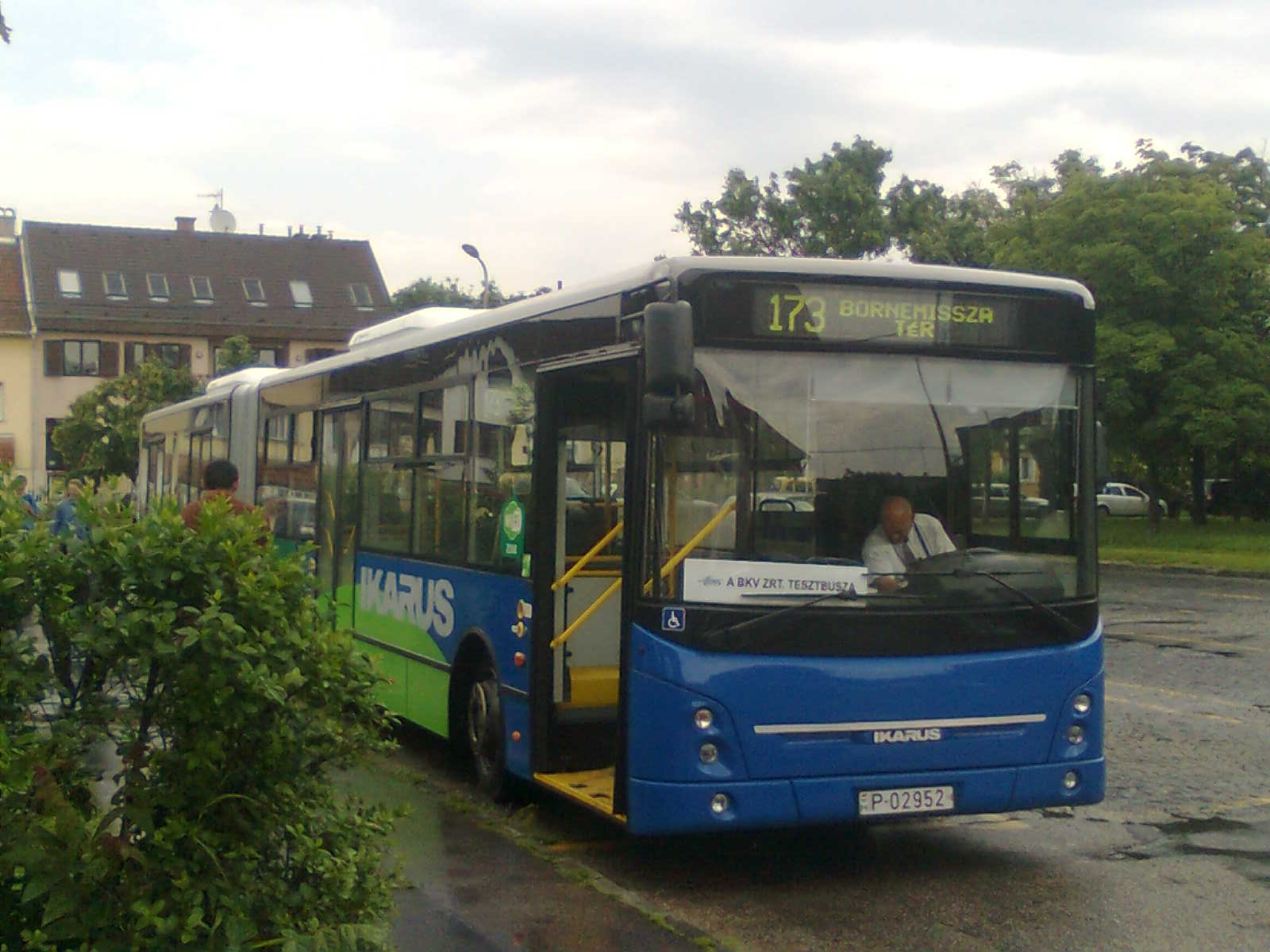
The first unit of the Széles-ARC agreement, an Ikarus V187

In 2010, Széles, who by this time managed to license the Ikarus brand from Irisbus, proposed a deal to ARC, which consisted of the following: the Műszertechnika Holding Rt. and Auto Rad Controlle creates a new company called Magyar Autóbuszgyártó Kft. (eng.: Hungarian Autobus Manufacturer Ltd.). The former gives the Ikarus name for the vehicles and provides orders from Hungarian and Russian customers, while the latter builds the units.

The "new" models were produced without any modification, but the changing of ARC logo to Ikarus. However, they did receive new model names on the following pattern: ARC 187 became Ikarus V187, where V stands for Városi (eng.: City). Still in 2010 a trolleybus prototype, called ARC-SZKT Tr187, was created from an earlier agreement disclosed by ARC. This vehicle was co-constructed by the Szegedi Közlekedési Társaság and was essentially the articulated trolleybus version of the Ikarus V187. Later a total number of 13 vehicles were delivered to the SZKT. These units were the first facelifted units of the Ikarus-ARC cooperation. The model also received a new name: Ikarus-Škoda Tr187.2, as the electrical systems were provided by the Czech manufacturer. The new design, which was later adopted by the autobuses as well, was created by János Tóth, a former designer of the NABI.

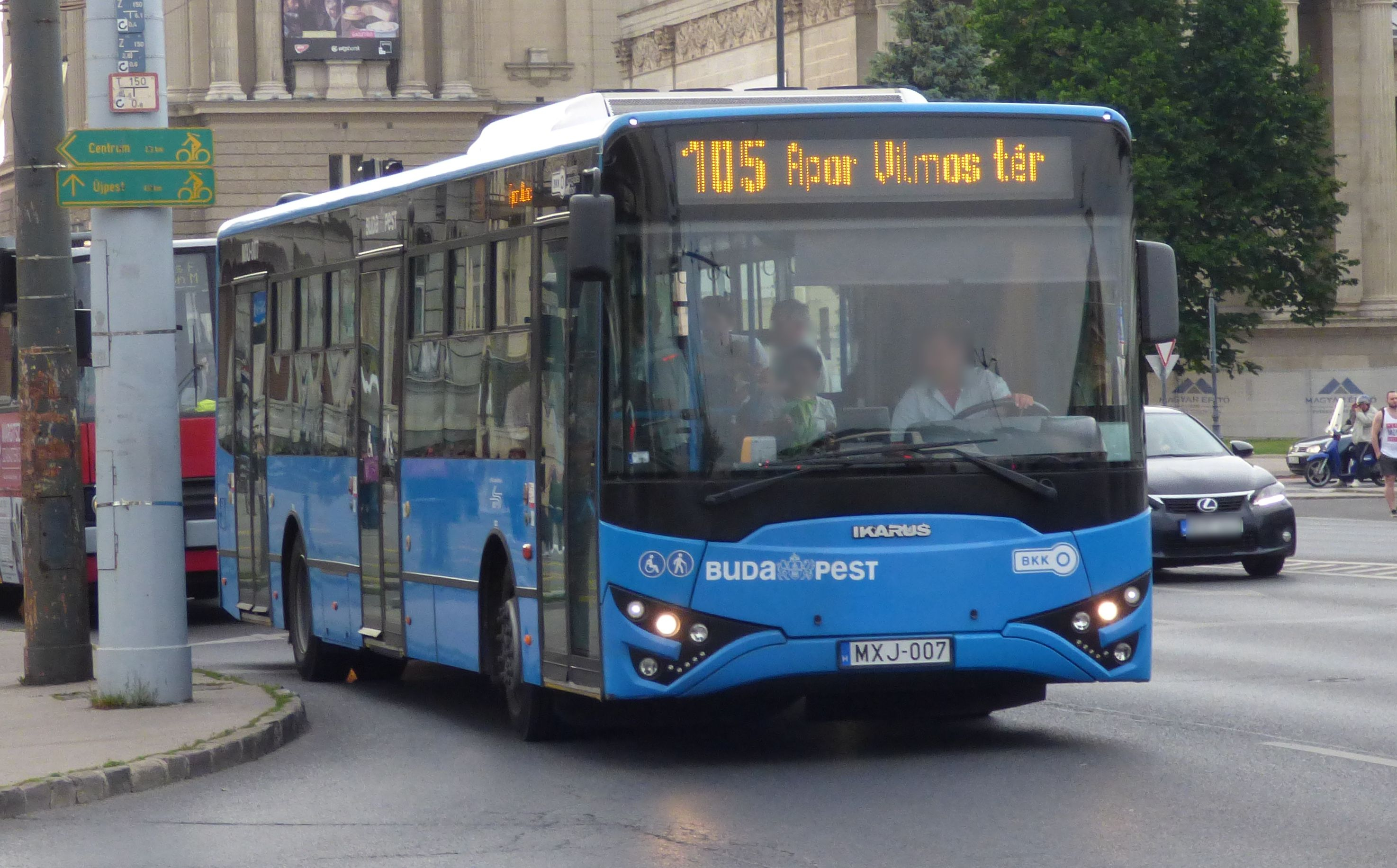
One of BKV's Ikarus V127 V2s, with the facelifted design

In 2013, a series of 18 units of the Ikarus V127 V2 model was ordered by BKV Zrt. in PKD construction, meaning that ARC-Ikarus only produced the major parts of these vehicles, while the operating company had to finish them. Later 50 more units were ordered by BKV in 2014.

=== Departure from Széles ===
In 2014, Auto Rad Controlle decided to break the agreement with Gábor Széles, because he failed to provide them with the promised orders and the company came close to closing down.

== MABI-Bus Kft. ==
=== Lanta Consulting Kft. ===
The Lanta is a small company, which's main area of expertise and works are restoring older Ikarus models. This manufacturer managed to buy back the rights to build the models of Ikarus EAG and to use the brand from Irisbus.

=== Evopro Holding Zrt. ===
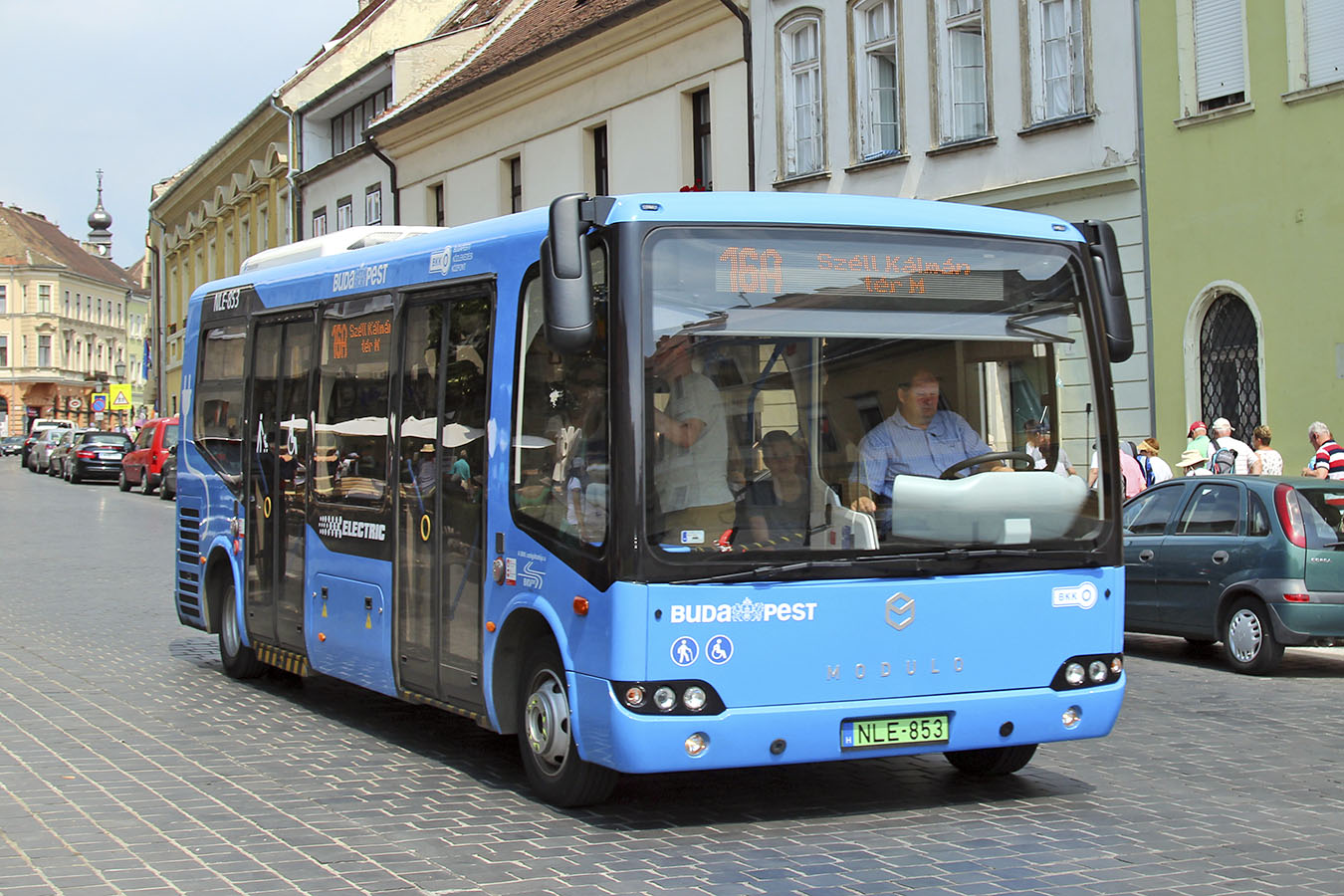
A Modulo C68e in Budapest

Evopro is in the hands of Csaba Mészáros and was producing a variety of products, including small, Electric buses with composite, modular build, under the model name Modulo Medio Electric. 20 of these vehicles were sold, after renaming the model to Modulo C68e, to the BKV in 2014, but they proved to be severely unreliable by 2016. After 75% of them were constantly incapable of leaving the garage and 100% were useless during winter time, BKV even decided to dispose one of them in 2018.

=== MABI-Bus Kft. ===
In 2015, the Evopro Holding bought the earlier closed down Hungarian plant of NABI and then with Auto Rad Controlle and Lanta Consulting established a new company called MABI-Bus Kft. At this point, the new company could have produced:

- E-series Ikarus buses, since Lanta had the rights of Ikarus EAG.
- NABI Sirius buses, because Evopro had the rights for these.
- the Ikarus V187/V127 models without the Ikarus brand, because Széles only provided the brand name, while the vehicles were developed by ARC.

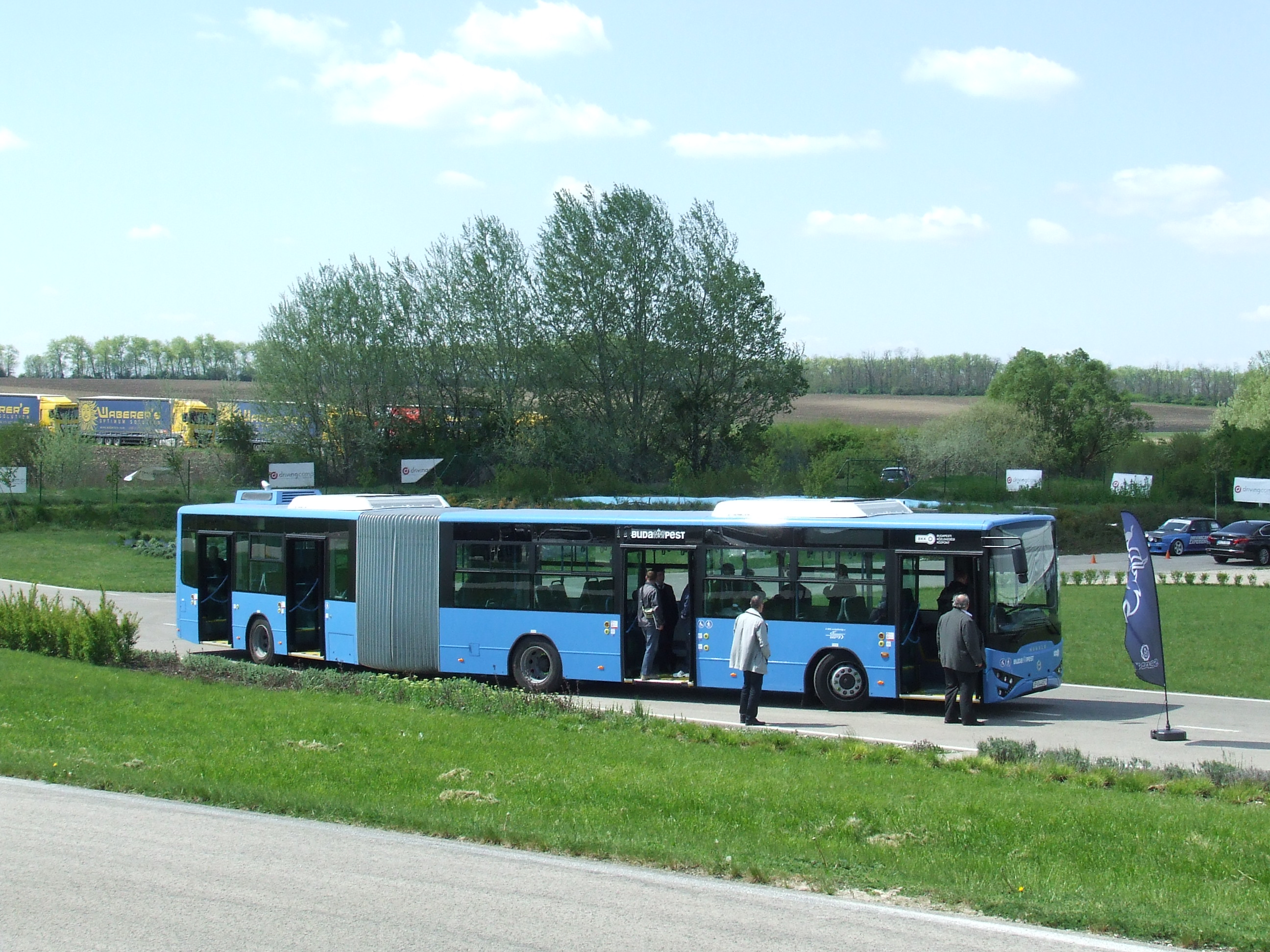
A working prototype of the Modulo M168d model

However MABI decided not to use the Ikarus brand on its vehicles, yet later the company was renamed to Ikarus Egyedi Kft. Ever since there is a constant litigation between Mészáros' Ikarus Egyedi and Széles' Műszertechnika Holding which still licenses the original parent company's Ikarus name.

In 2016, more than 50% of the company's shares were bought by the Austrian VIECAP Gmbh.

In 2018, after failing to produce 180 units of the Modulo M168d model (the successors of Ikarus V187), the company got dangerously close to bankruptcy. The limited number of vehicles that were delivered to BKV on the other hand, were all suffering from serious design flaws and differed from the construction that was ordered. These proved to be incapable to serve in traffic.

On 9 July, Csaba Mészáros, chairman of the Ikarus Egyedi Kft. asked for bankruptcy protection from the government, as the company became insolvent and production was ceased.

== Ikarus Global Zrt. ==
In 2017, Széles started to promote his new company, called Ikarus Global Zrt., which was to produce new, LNG heavily based on Ikarus V127 model. Even though the rights to produce those vehicles remain with Auto Rad Controlle. However, no such or any vehicle was produced by the company as of June 2018.

== Bibliography ==
- Gerlei – Kukla – Lovász (2008). Az Ikarus évszázados története. Budapest, Maróti Könyvkereskedés és Könyvkiadó Kft. ISBN 9789639005853
