= Ikarus 55 =

High-floor rear-engine Ikarus coach

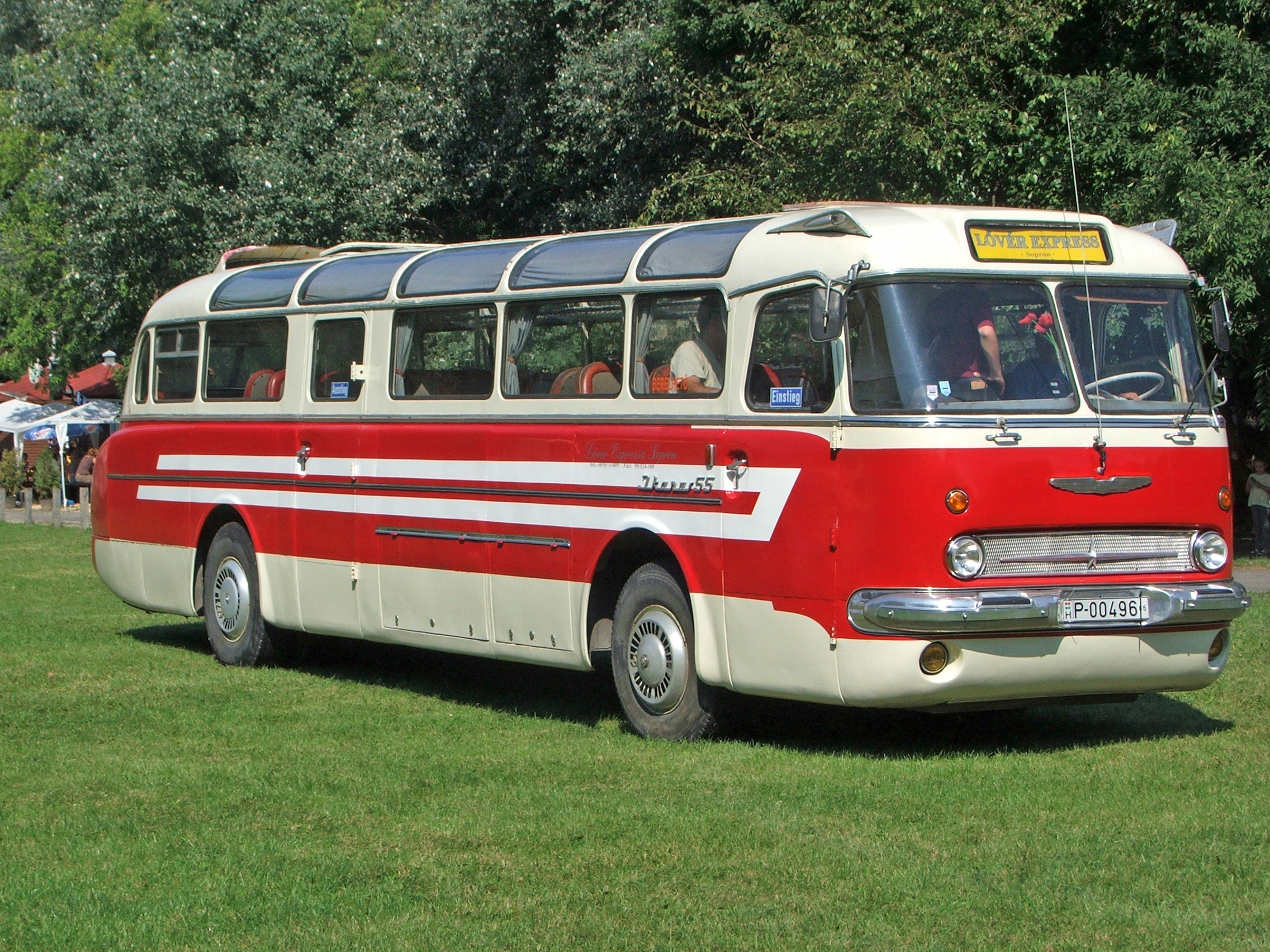
- Ikarus 55

Overview
- Manufacturer: Ikarus

Body and chassis
- Doors: Two
- Floor type: High-floor
- Chassis: Semi-self-supporting
- Related: Ikarus 66

Powertrain
- Engine: Csepel D-614 (straight-six, Diesel)
- Capacity: 32–44 passengers, seated
- Power output: 107 kW (143 hp)
- Transmission: 5+1 manual gearbox

Dimensions
- Wheelbase: 5,550 mm (18 ft 2 1/2 in)
- Length: 11,400 mm (37 ft 4 7/8 in)
- Width: 2,500 mm (8 ft 2 3/8 in)
- Height: 2,900 mm (9 ft 6 1/8 in)
- Kerb weight: 9,500 kg (20,900 lb)

Chronology
- Predecessor: none
- Successor: Ikarus 256

The Ikarus 55 is a high-floor coach designated for long-distance as well as interurban traffic, and the first rear-engine Ikarus bus. It was made from 1952 to 1973, alongside the technically related Ikarus 66, by the Hungarian bus maker Ikarus. In total, 8,350 Ikarus 55 and 66 were delivered to East Germany.

== Technical description ==
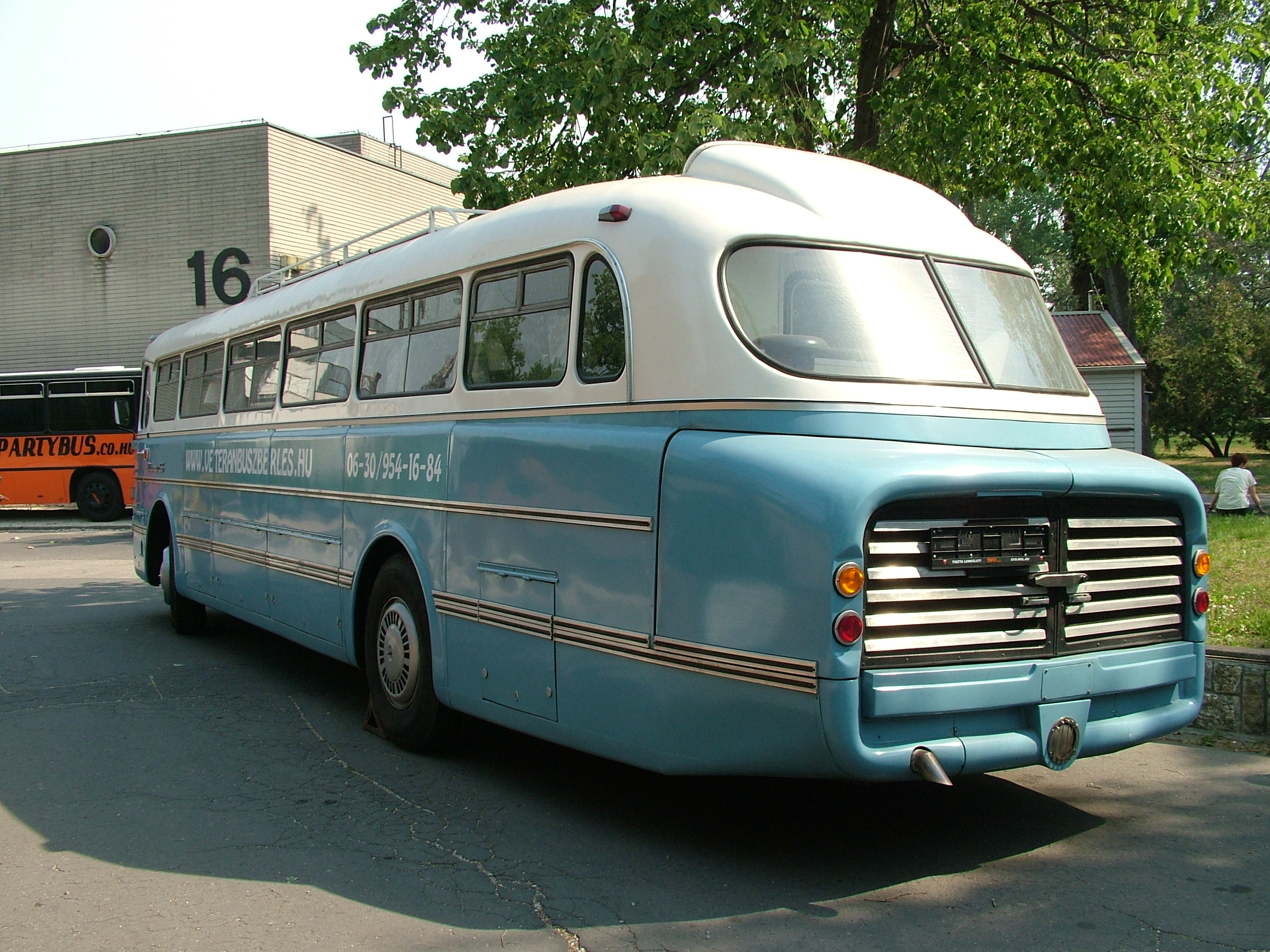
Ikarus 55, rear view

Designed as a high-floor two-axle bus, the Ikarus 55 has a semi-self supporting body, with the engine installed behind the rear seats at the back. Both front and rear axles are leaf-sprung beam axles, with the rear axle being a live planetary axle. Only the front axle has hydraulic shock absorbers. Twin tyres are fitted on the rear axle, whilst single tyres are fitted on the front axle. Their dimension is 11–20 in (279–508 mm). The steering system is fully mechanical and not power assisted. A pneumatic braking system is installed, all four wheels have drum brakes. The parking brake is foot-operated.

The Ikarus 55 is powered by a water-cooled, naturally aspirated, 8.3-litre (510 cu in) Csepel D-614 swirl chamber injected straight-six Diesel engine. This engine is a modified Steyr WD 613 engine with an enlarged cylinder bore, that was built under licence by Csepel. It is rated DIN 145 PS (107 kW; 143 hp) with a maximum torque of 50 kp⋅m (490 N⋅m). The torque is transmitted to a partial synchromesh five-speed gearbox via a single-disc dry clutch. Depending on the gear ratio, the top speed is in between 78 and 98 km/h (48 and 61 mph). The engine's best fuel consumption is rated approximately 190 g·PS^{−1}·h^{−1} (258 g·kW^{−1}·h^{−1})

== Bibliography ==
- Oswald, Werner (2000), Kraftfahrzeuge der DDR (in German) (2nd ed.), Stuttgart: Motorbuch-Verlag, ISBN 3-613-01913-2
