= Ikarus (Hungarian company) =

Hungarian Bus manufacturer

Ikarus Bus

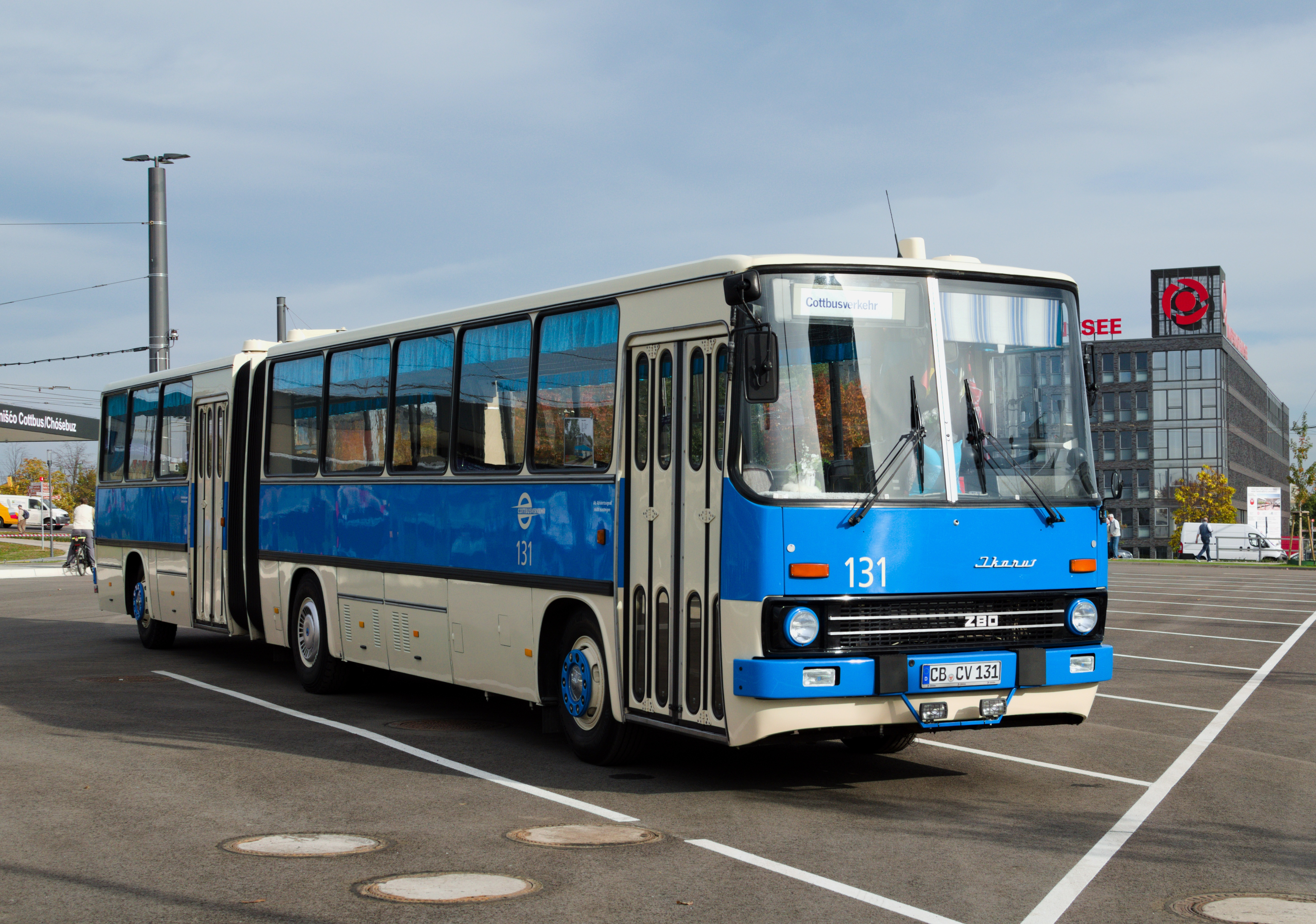
- Company type: Private company
- Industry: Bus manufacturing
- Founded: Original: 1895 (130 years ago); Relaunch: 8 February 1949 (76 years ago)
- Founders: Imre Uhry
- Successor: Successor companies
- Headquarters: Budapest, Austria-Hungary (1895–1918); Budapest, Hungary (1918–2003)
- Area served: 82 countries worldwide
- Key people: Gábor Széles – chairman
- Products: Buses, Trolleybuses, Special built vehicles
- Owner: Gábor Széles
- Parent: Irisbus (1999–2003)
- Subsidiaries: Ikarus EAG; American-Ikarus
- Website: https://ikarus.hu/en/

Ikarus (also known as Ikarus Bus, in Hungarian is called Ikarus Autobuszgyár) is a bus manufacturer based in Budapest and Székesfehérvár, Hungary. It was established in 1895 as Imre Uhry's Blacksmith Workshop and Coach Factory (hun.: Uhry Imre Kovács- és Kocsigyártó Üzeme) and, during the Communist era in Hungary, it dominated bus markets of the entire Eastern Bloc and its allies.

== History ==
=== Early history (1895–1932) ===
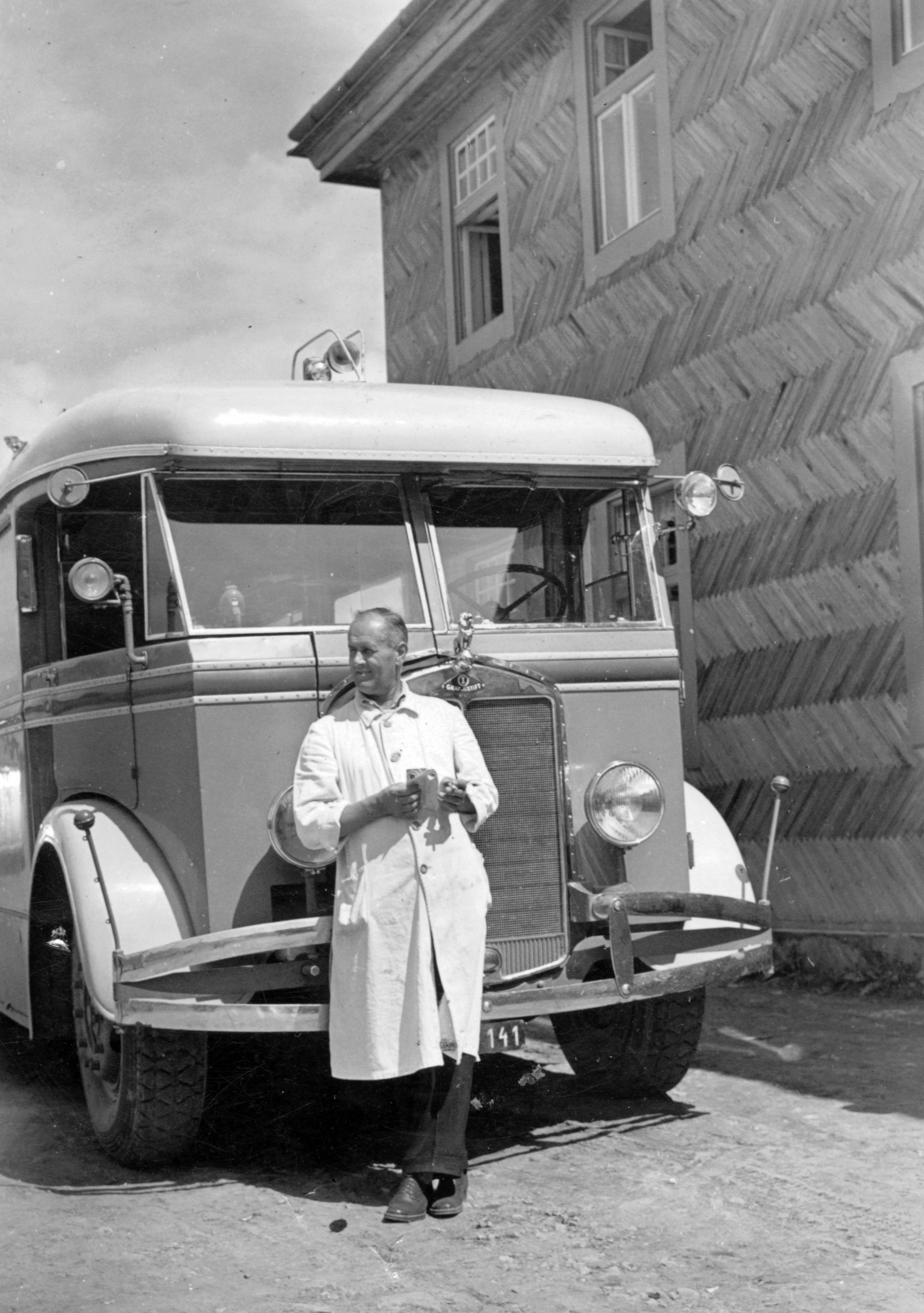
Uhry's bus built on the Gräf & Stift chassis

The company's direct predecessor was established in Budapest in 1895, when Imre Uhry opened his Blacksmith Workshop. The little company's main profile was to repair carts and horseshoes. However, Uhry constantly upgraded his workshop from the stable income he gained, and within a few years, the workshop started to produce its first carriages, drays and chariots. After a number of expansions, Uhry bought a new plant in 1913, and by the outbreak of World War I, they started to focus on building and repairing truck superstructures. When the war finally ended in 1918, the company was one of the most significant manufacturers. One reason is because the Austro-Hungarian Empire collapsed and Uhry's company was one of the few not finding itself on the outer side of the new borders. The other is because the company was taking a significant part in the war production.

In the early 1920s, another enlargement of the company was due to happen, which eventually resulted in a new name: Uhry Imre Car-body and Trailer Factory (Uhry Imre Karosszéria és Pótkocsigyár). Prior to the 1930s, the company was primarily producing various and unique superstructures on foreign companies' chassis, like Ford, Mercedes-Benz, FIAT, Büssing or Gräf & Stift. These included trucks, buses and even some passenger cars. The Uhry company was doing better as time went by. In 1929, the 1,000th truck superstructure was produced. Although, at this time, the company did not have any export products, from time to time, some models caught international spotlight. For example, in 1934, the company's luxury autobus built on a Gräf & Stift chassis was presented on the French Concours d'Élégance car beauty contest. The company's three most important customers were the Hungarian State companies Hungarian State Railways (MÁV), the Hungarian State Railways Auto Transportation Company (MAVART) and one of the predecessors of Budapest Transportation Company (BSzKRt). These companies were constantly ordering from Uhry's factory, up until the Great Depression hit Hungary in 1930. The crisis suddenly cut most of the orders, production was almost stopped. The situation forced Uhry to sell the vehicles below their real value and to take loans. Eventually, by 1932, the situation led to the bankruptcy of Uhry Imre Car body and Trailer Factory.

=== From reorganisation to the Communist Era (1933–1948) ===
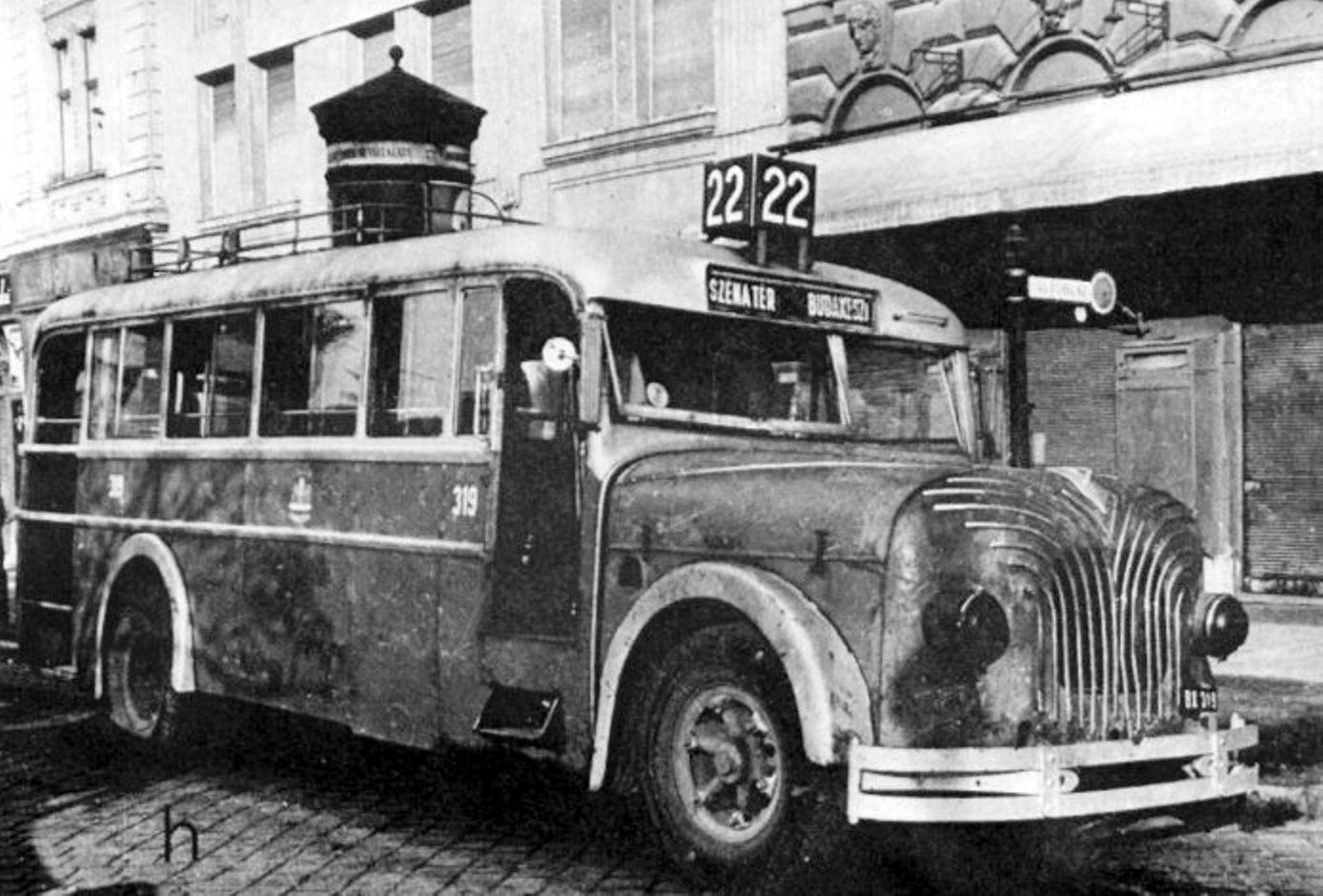
An MÁVAG N2h/39 damaged during World War II

In 1933, the children of Imre Uhry established a new company on the ruins of the old, which was called Uhri Siblings Car-body and Vehicle Factory (Uhri Testvérek Autókarosszéria és Járműgyár). The children were using their family name with the letter "i" instead of "y". The new company's first three years went by steadily, without any major success, but in 1936, the BSzKRt, the company then responsible for Budapest's public transportation, ordered 50 diesel buses on MÁVAG–Mercedes chassis. These vehicles were still produced with wooden body, but the factory did hire new engineers, who started to work on a metal body variant, which was to be mass-produced.

During this period of the company, it was not customary to actually name their products. When we are referring to each type, it usually has to be done by the chassis it was built on and the year of production.

The first metal-body autobus in Hungary was the Uhri Siblings' MÁVAG N26/36, which was followed by a successor with some modifications every year. Four models were mass-produced, primarily for Budapest: the standard MÁVAG N26/39 and N26/40, as well as the "hill" version N2h/39 and N2h/40. These four were nicknamed Catfish due to their unique front decoration. A total number of 184 units were produced of them.

In 1942, the company, which employed almost a thousand people, started to produce aircraft. The site on Margit Street, founded at that time, was one of the bastions of domestic vehicle production until the turn of the Millennium.

In 1948, like many other enterprises in the newly-established Second Hungarian Republic at the time, the company was nationalised and thus became property of the state, which was followed by the Uhri-family's departure from Hungary (who left out of fear from the newly-formed government backed by the Soviet Union).

=== Golden age – the Communist era (1948–1989) ===
Ikarus-MÁVAG Tr 5
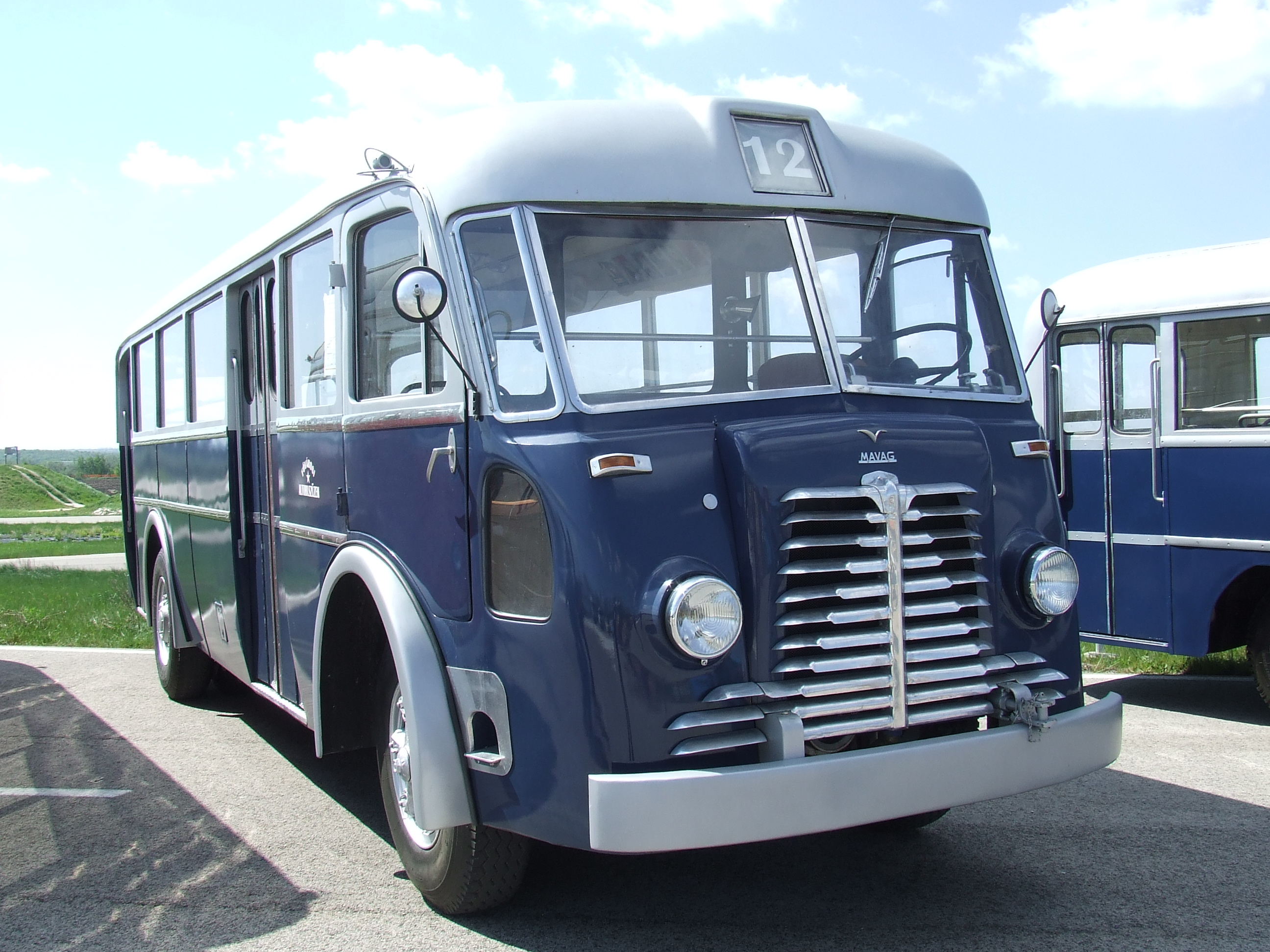
- The sole survivor of the Tr 5 model, in 2016

Overview
- Production: 1947–1950
- Designer: Vendel Cziráki, Kornél Stróbl

Body and chassis
- Doors: 2
- Chassis: MÁVAG LO 5000

Powertrain
- Engine: Láng OML 674
- Power output: 105 hp

Dimensions
- Length: 9.4 m
- Width: 2.48 m
- Height: 2.67 m

Chronology
- Predecessor: MÁVAG N2h/40
- Successor: Ikarus 60

==== Prelude to the Ikarus models ====
In 1948, the old customer, the BSzKRt ordered a new line of buses for its fleet and for this request the — now state-owned — company developed a brand new model, the 'Tr 5. It was 9.5 metres in length and was built on a MÁVAG LO 5000 type chassis. In 1949, new changes were implemented by the communist government. The Uhri Siblings Car-body and Vehicle Factory was merged with:

- the Airplane Factory (Repülőgépgyár Rt.)
- the Ikarus Machine- and Metal Products Company (Ikarus Gép- és Fémáru Rt.)

Hence the Ikarus Body- and Vehicle Factory (Ikarus Karosszéria- és Járműgyár) was created on 8 February.

However, the company's products still did not bear the name Ikarus until 1951, although the winged logo started to appear even on the Tr 5 models, built after 1949, and the three other models, not using the company name.

As a result of the war, there was a shortage of chassis in Hungary, but at the same time, there was a growing need for buses, as most of them were destroyed or severely damaged during the Siege of Budapest. The engineers were forced by the circumstances to develop a bus model without chassis. The result was the model Tr 3,5 with a unibody construction in 1948, which was the first in the world of its type. Some sources suggest the German Setra S8 as the first with such unibody construction, but that model was only started to be built in 1950. The small Tr 3,5 weighted only 3,7 tonnes – hence the name – and was 7.73 metres in length. The engine was produced by Rába, but at the time, the company could only produce some pre-war models that were used for their own — at this point obsolete — bus model, the Special.

During this short period, Ikarus had ambitious plans, as they designed two different bus models exclusively for export goals. One of these was the A19, which was designed with Southern-American standards in mind. It was built on a 10.5 metres long chassis, and every single passenger seat was rendered next to a window. The model was also full of decorations. Despite all the attempts, only two prototypes of the model were built, and both of them remained in Hungary.

The other attempt for export was much more successful. This model was called the M5 and was built on the same chassis as the Tr 5, but received a redesigned front, manually operated swing doors and somewhat more passenger seats. A total number of 170 of the model were produced, out of which 90 were sold to Poland, 45 to Romania, and even though it was intended to be an export model, 35 to the Hungarian company MÁVAUT.

==== Models between 1951 and 1967 ====
Ikarus 30
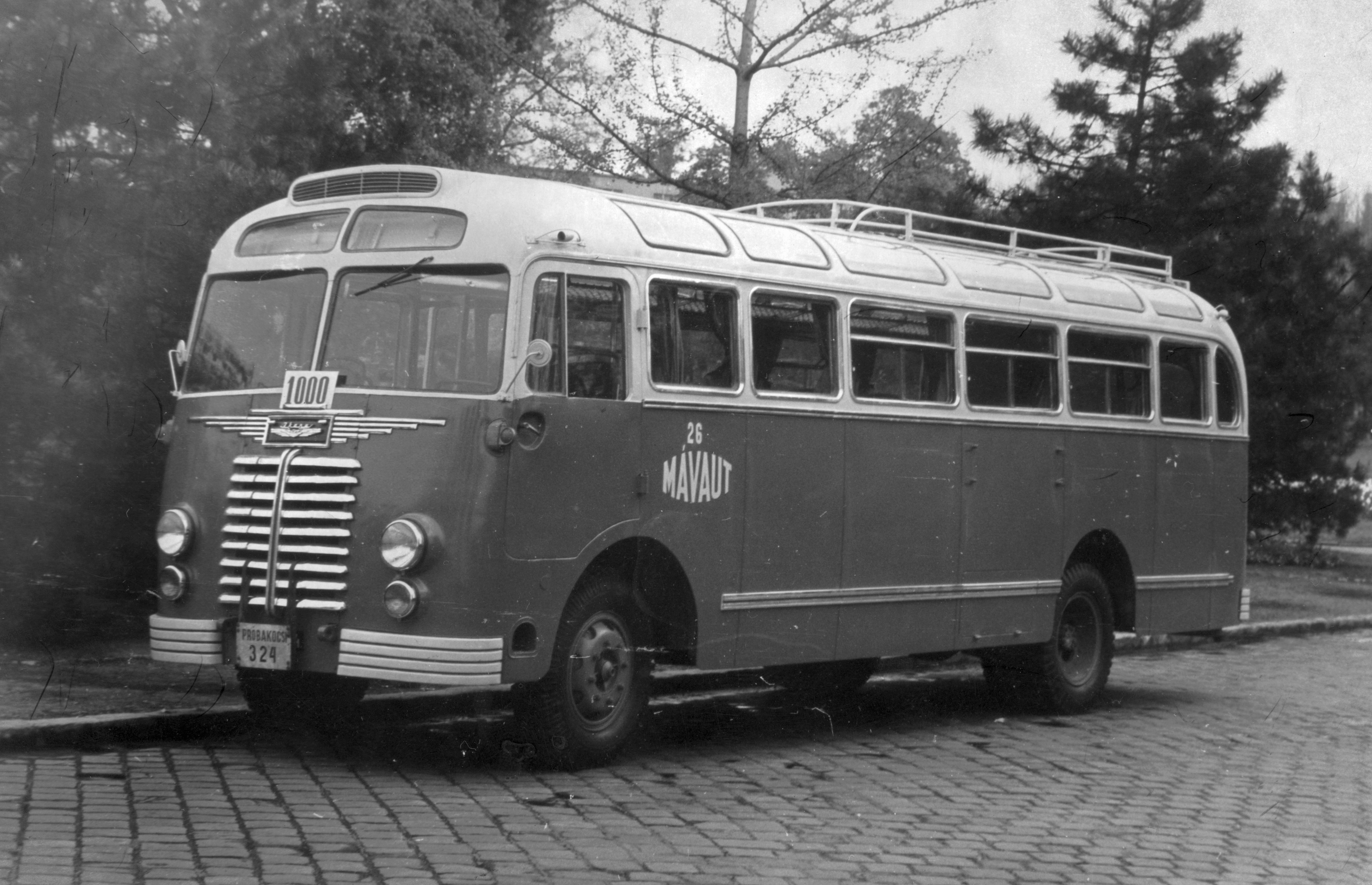
- The 1000th unit of the Ikarus 30

Overview
- Type: city/coach
- Production: 1951–1957

Body and chassis
- Doors: 2
- Chassis: self supporting

Powertrain
- Engine: Csepel D-413
- Power output: 83 hp

Dimensions
- Length: 8.4 m
- Width: 2.3 m
- Height: 2.94 m

Chronology
- Predecessor: Ikarus Tr 3,5
- Successor: Ikarus 31

In 1951, after a long and heated argument between the engineers and the political decision makers on whether unibody or body-on-frame vehicles should be produced, the parties managed to reach a compromise. The engineers — who were pro-unibody — were allowed to design one of the two upcoming models with such construction. But they were only permitted to develop a smaller bus, a successor to the Tr 3,5, while the political will forced them to create the larger vehicles (the successor of the Tr 5) on chassis. Out of this "compromise", the company's first vehicle was born that was actually bearing the factory's name: the Ikarus 30. It was designed as a universal vehicle to serve city and intercity routes, as well as coach services. However, the bus proved to be insufficient to be used in the cities, as it was way too small, narrow, and the windows on the roof were creating a greenhouse effect during the summer. Hence, the model received the sobriquet of nylonbus from the passengers.

As much as it proved to be an insufficient city bus, it was successful as a coach. It became the first of many Ikarus models to be exported in large numbers. East Germany and China bought over 600 units each, while Czechoslovakia also ordered 500 vehicles.

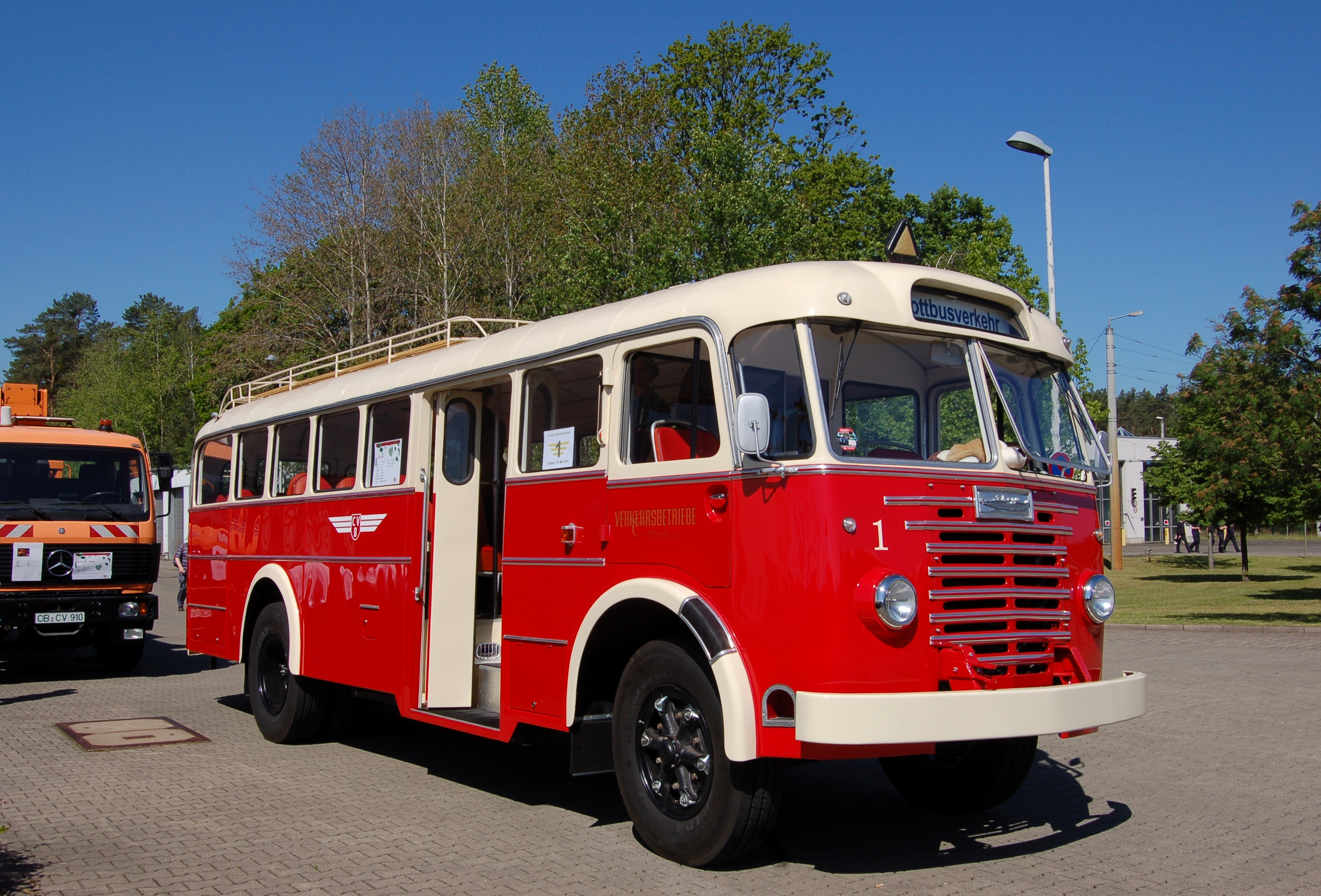
A restored Ikarus 60 used by the German traffic company Cottbusverkehr

The year 1951 sought another new model's birth as well: the Ikarus 60, which was the successor of the Tr 5 model. The Ikarus 60, as mentioned before, was a body-on-frame design forced by the decision makers, designed by the Vehicle Development Institution (Járműfejlesztési Intézet or JÁFI) and constructed by Ikarus itself. The Ikarus 60 proved to be a versatile vehicle and with some modifications, many submodels were built on its basis. The most notable example is the Ikarus 60T, produced between 1952 and 1956, which was the company's first trolleybus model.

The other important submodels were the ITC 600 and the IC 660, which were built between 1960 and 1967 as one of the first mass-produced articulated bus models in the world. These modification were not done by Ikarus or its workers, but by FAÜ, one of the operator companies. Hence, they were often referred to as FAÜ-articulated (FAÜ-csuklós).

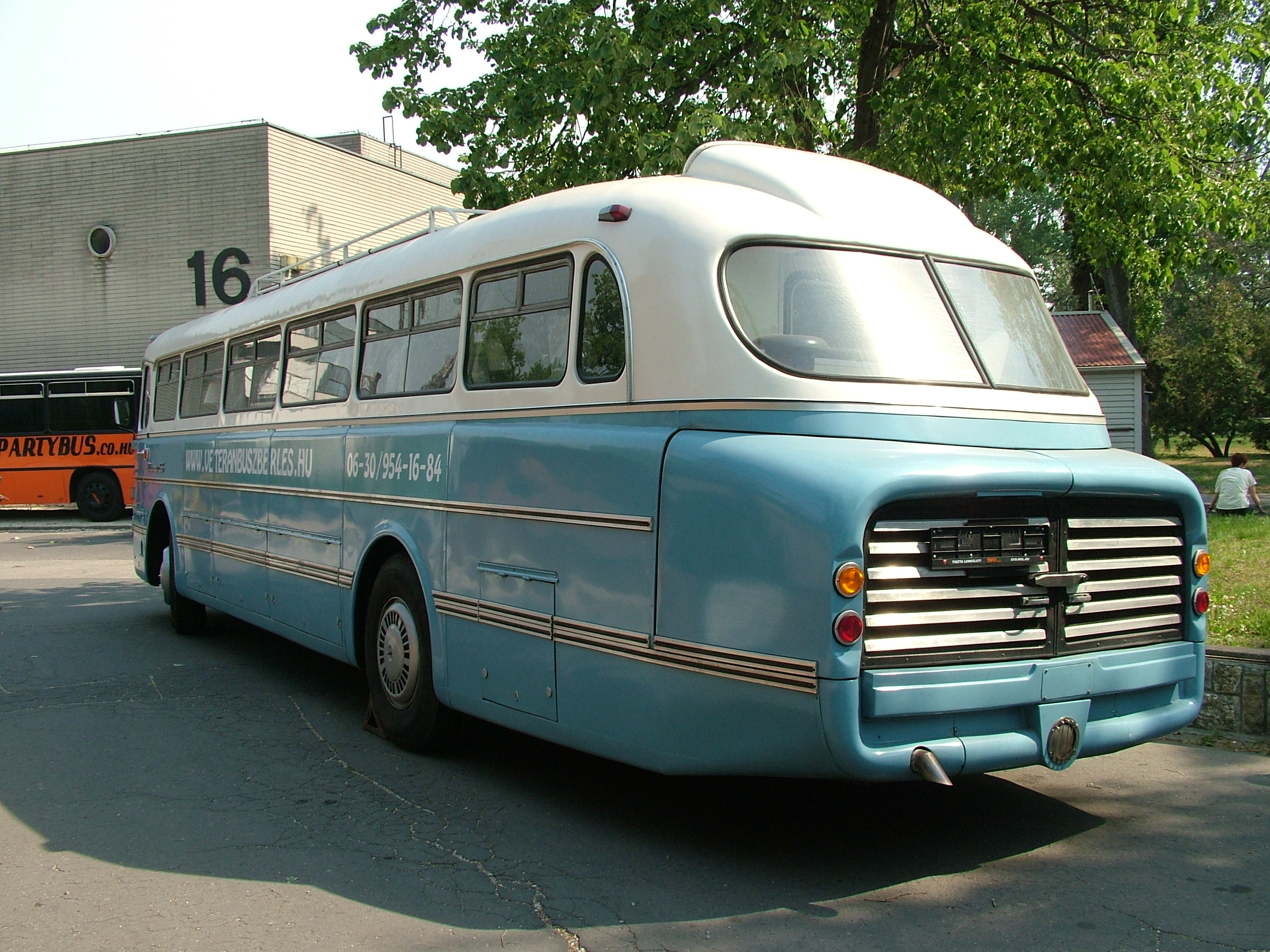
The unique rear section of a restored Ikarus 55

There are a number of great achievements belonging to the company and one of those were the Ikarus 55 and Ikarus 66 sister models. Of the two unique models, there were a total of 16,726 units built between 1952 and 1973. Their engines were mounted in the rear section of the vehicles, which had a distinctive configuration and look, resulting in its common nickname Faros (roughly: Buttocks). The sister models became icons of Hungarian bus history.

In the second half of the 1950s, Ikarus started to develop the successors of the Ikarus 30 and 60 models, hence created the Ikarus 31 and the Ikarus 620. The former was sold in large numbers to East Germany, while the latter was popular in Hungary and the Soviet Union.

In 1963, the Hungarian state decided to merge the Általános Mechanikai Gépgyár or ÁMG ("General Mechanical Machine Factory") with Ikarus. ÁMG's factory was in Székesfehérvár, hence the second plant of Ikarus was created there.

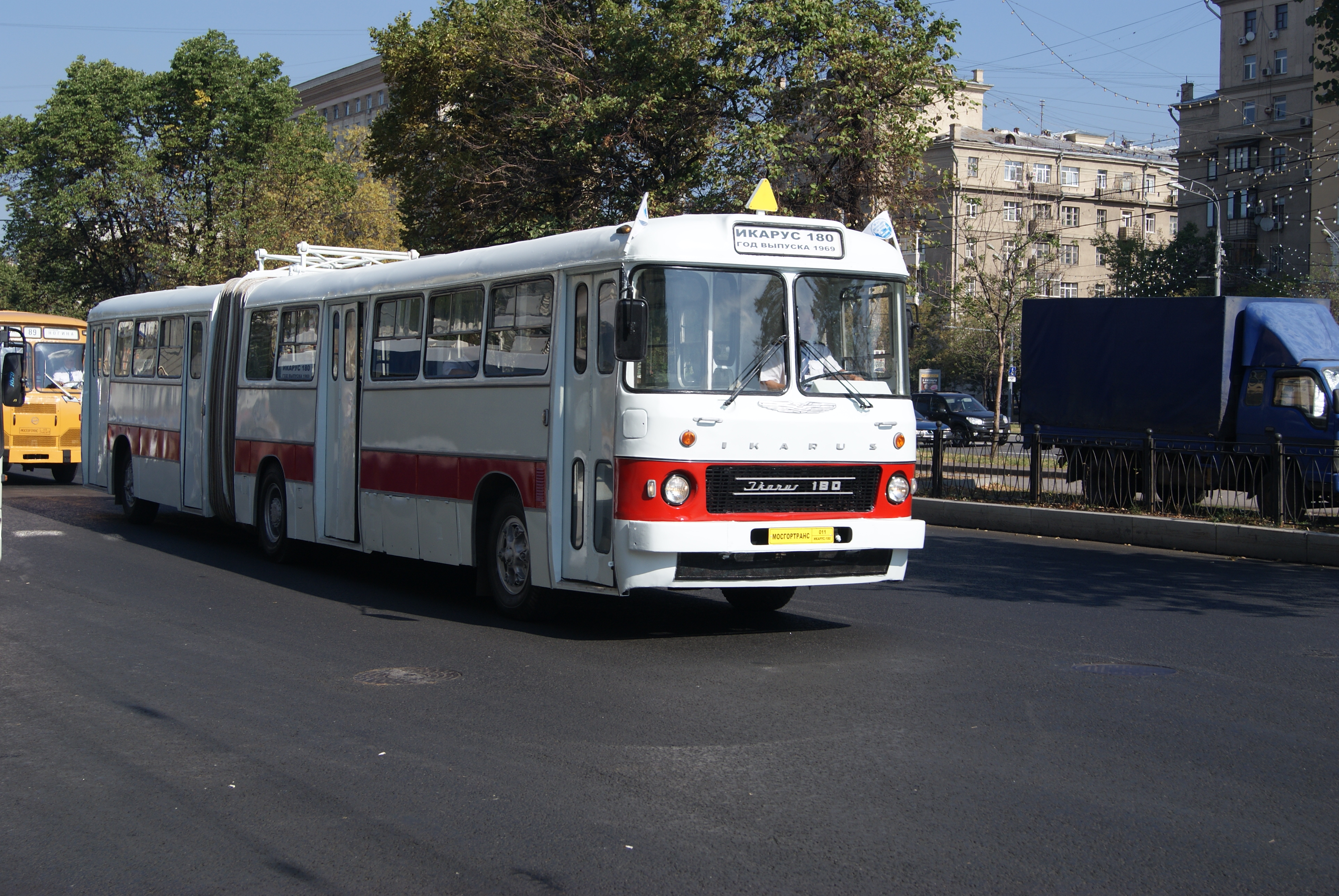
A restored Ikarus 180 in Moscow, Russia

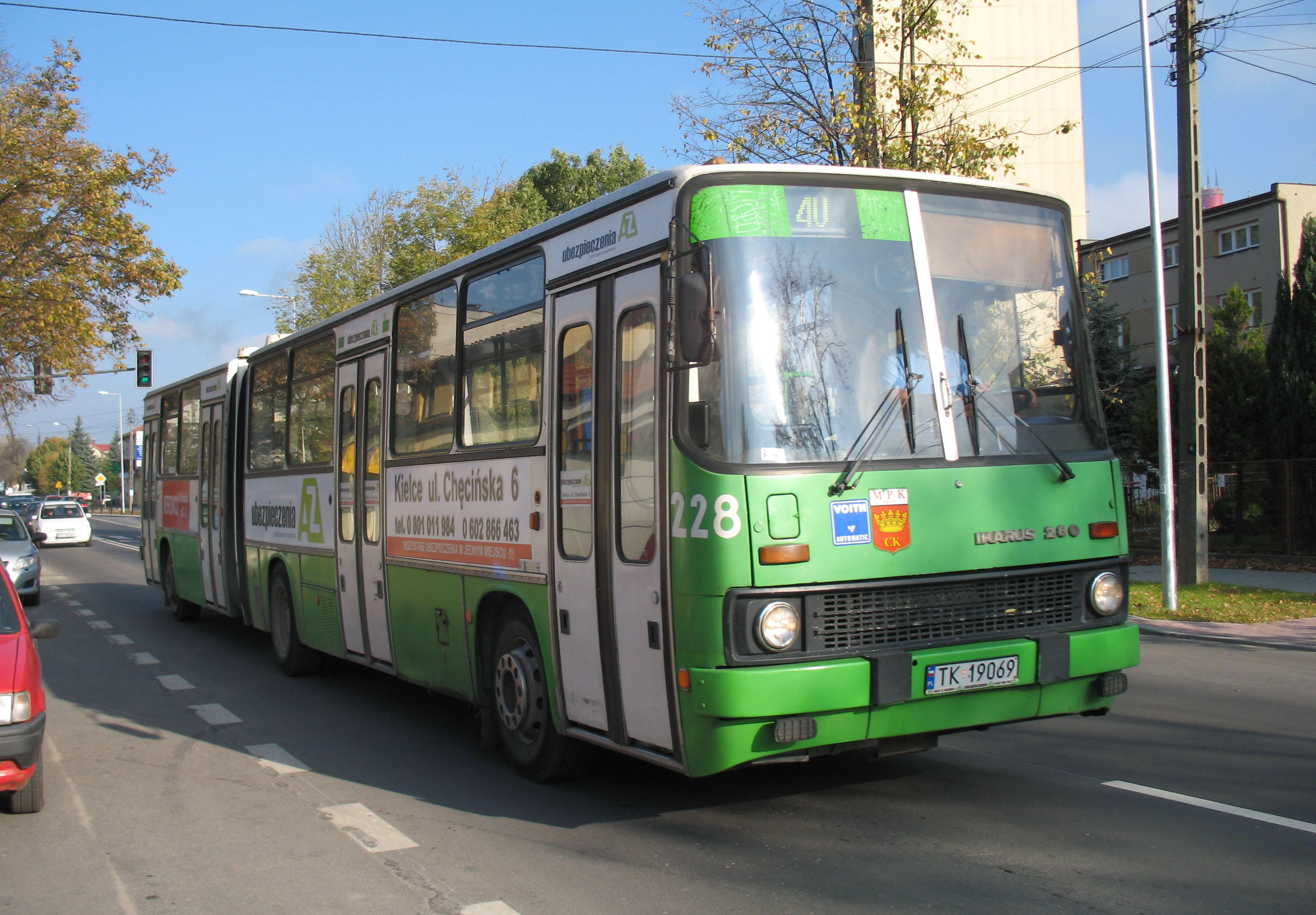
An Ikarus 280 in Kielce, Poland built 1997

The 1960s were spent by redesigning the palette of models, out of which three models were born, which were based on the same design and elements: Ikarus 180, 556 and 557, which were to give an alternative to all the existing and still operating previous models. The Ikarus 180 must be highlighted out of the triumvirate, as it was the first articulated bus model developed and produced by Ikarus. Although, it must be mentioned, that for the development, the company acquired a Henschel HS 160 USL vehicle, which was developed by the German Henschel company and at the time was regarded as „The Articulated Bus”. Ikarus actually disassembled and reassembled the vehicle over and over again in order to understand it. Technically, it was almost identically copied by the engineers.

In the second half of the 1960s, the development of these three vehicles was stopped, when the company decided to invest most of its resources into a new, versatile model series. This series became known as the Ikarus 200-family (or series).

==== Ikarus 200-series ====
Ikarus 250
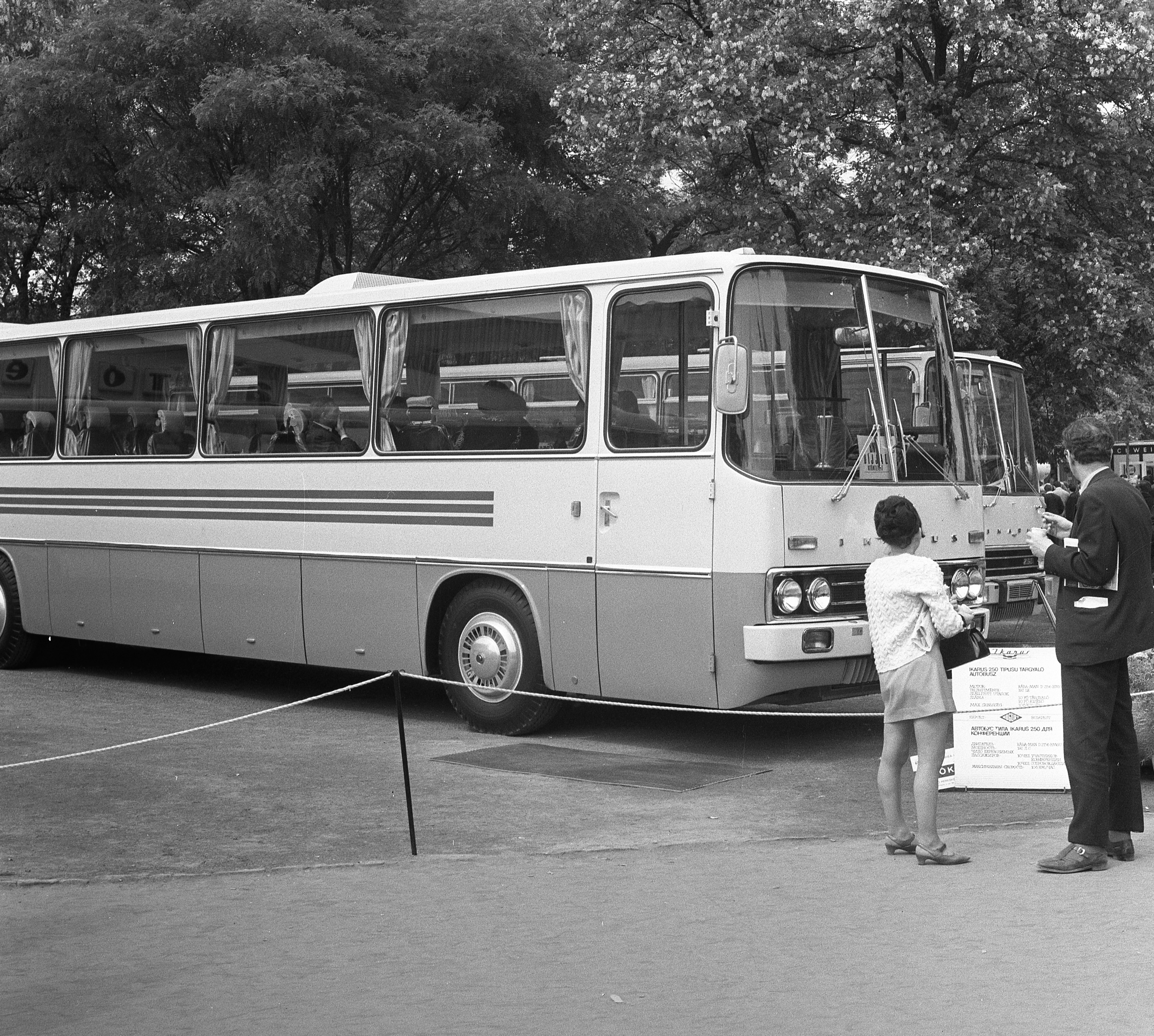
- An early unit of the Ikarus 250 SL model, in 1970

Overview
- Type: coach
- Production: 1967–1996
- Designer: Károly Oszetzky, László Finta

Body and chassis
- Doors: 1–3
- Chassis: self supporting

Powertrain
- Engine: Rába-MAN; D2156 HM6U (original engine)
- Power output: 217 hp
- Transmission: ASH-75 GY

Dimensions
- Length: 12 m
- Width: 2,5 m
- Height: 3.08 m
- Curb weight: 10.8–12.5 t

Chronology
- Predecessor: Ikarus 557
- Successor: Ikarus 350

The first prototype of the new model family, the Ikarus 250, was presented at the Budapest International Fair (BNV), in 1967. The whole idea behind this series was to create a model family which is versatile, one that can be easily modified to be sufficient as a city, a suburban or as a coach vehicle. Today, this is called modular design, but it was not yet a widespread solution in the late 1960s. It was the idea of designer László Finta to make the structure of the bus more angular, therefore creating more space along with better view for the passengers.

The prototypes were participating in a number of international events and contests and won quite a few awards. In 1969, at the International Autobus Week in Nice, the model won the silver trophy out of 17 other vehicles. It also participated in a contest in Monaco, 1971, where the Ikarus 250 SL (luxury submodel) won Rainier III's grand trophy.

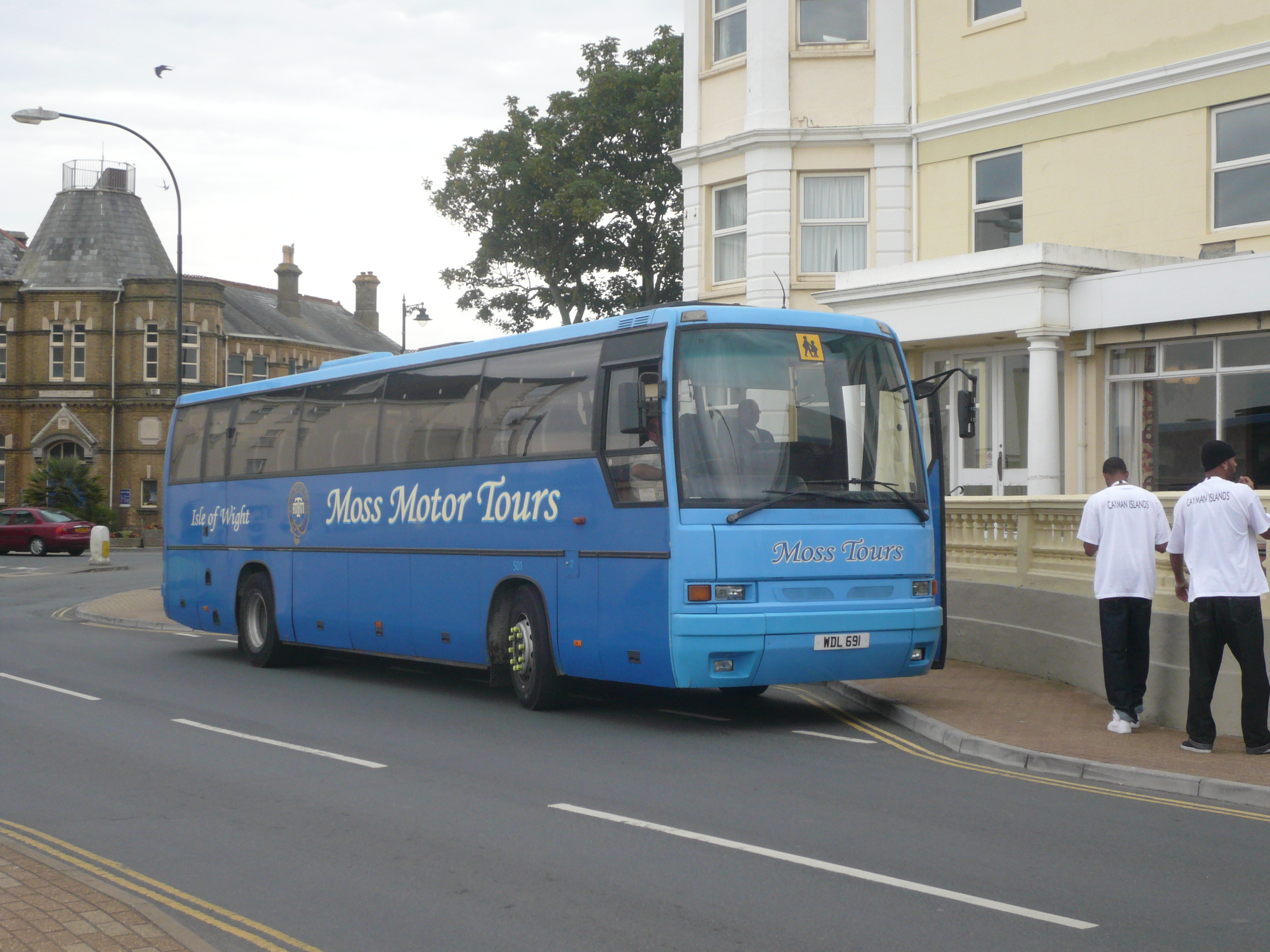
One of the many 300-series models, an Ikarus 350 in the U.K.

From 1968 onwards, Ikarus started to develop and produce a variety of experimental vehicles, in order to find the correct configuration for future models within the family. Finally, in 1971, the company decided that for city transportation, the best models will be the Ikarus 260 and Ikarus 280 models, which later on became the top-selling bus of that time. The articulated Ikarus was so successful worldwide that the company even got into the North-American market with its modified model, the Ikarus 286.

At its peak during the late 1970s and early 1980s, the company set such records that have not yet been challenged since, like:

- During the 1970s and 1980s, two-thirds of the world's articulated-bus production was related to the Ikarus 280.
- Of all the buses worldwide, the Ikarus 260 was one of the most produced with a unit number of 72,547.
- In the early 1980s, somewhat over 12,000 vehicles were produced yearly by the company's two factories in Hungary.

==== Ikarus 300-series ====
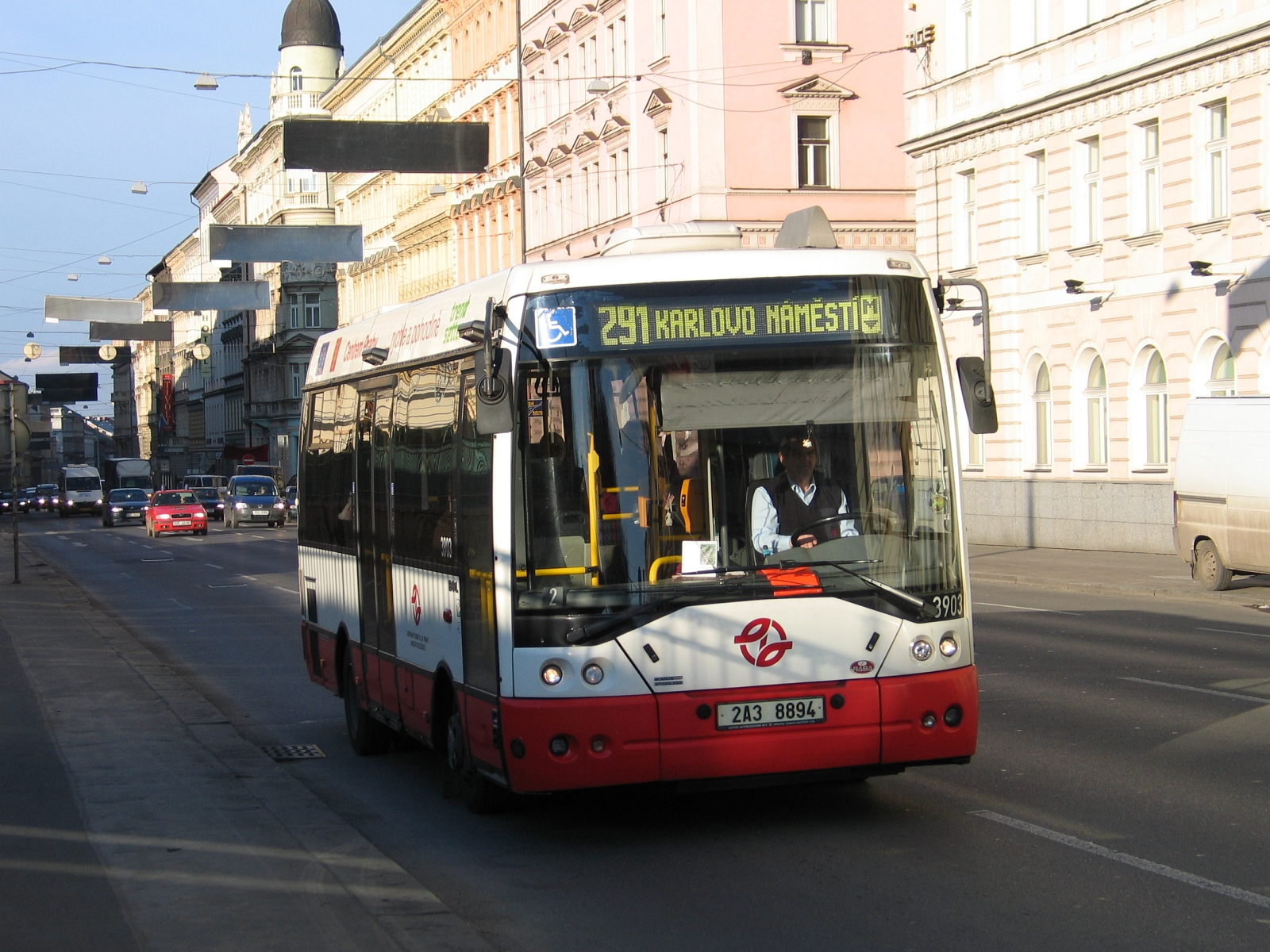
A midi Ikarus E91 in Prague, Czech Republic, serving as a castle bus

After the success of the 200-series, the company did not stop developing new projects. The policy, however, changed in the late 1970s from one modular model family to two. One of them was to succeed the coach branch of the previous series, and one was to do the same with the city/suburban branch. The latter became the 400-series, while the former was the Ikarus 300-series.

The first prototype of the 300-family was produced in 1981 and was bearing the name Ikarus 386 K1 (380 NE). It was later followed by a wide variety of models during the 1980s. Their major characteristics were the elevated passenger space, which made them resemble modern coaches. They were produced by Ikarus until 1989, when its newly formed subsidiary, the Ikarus EAG received their production and development branch.

==== Ikarus 400-series ====
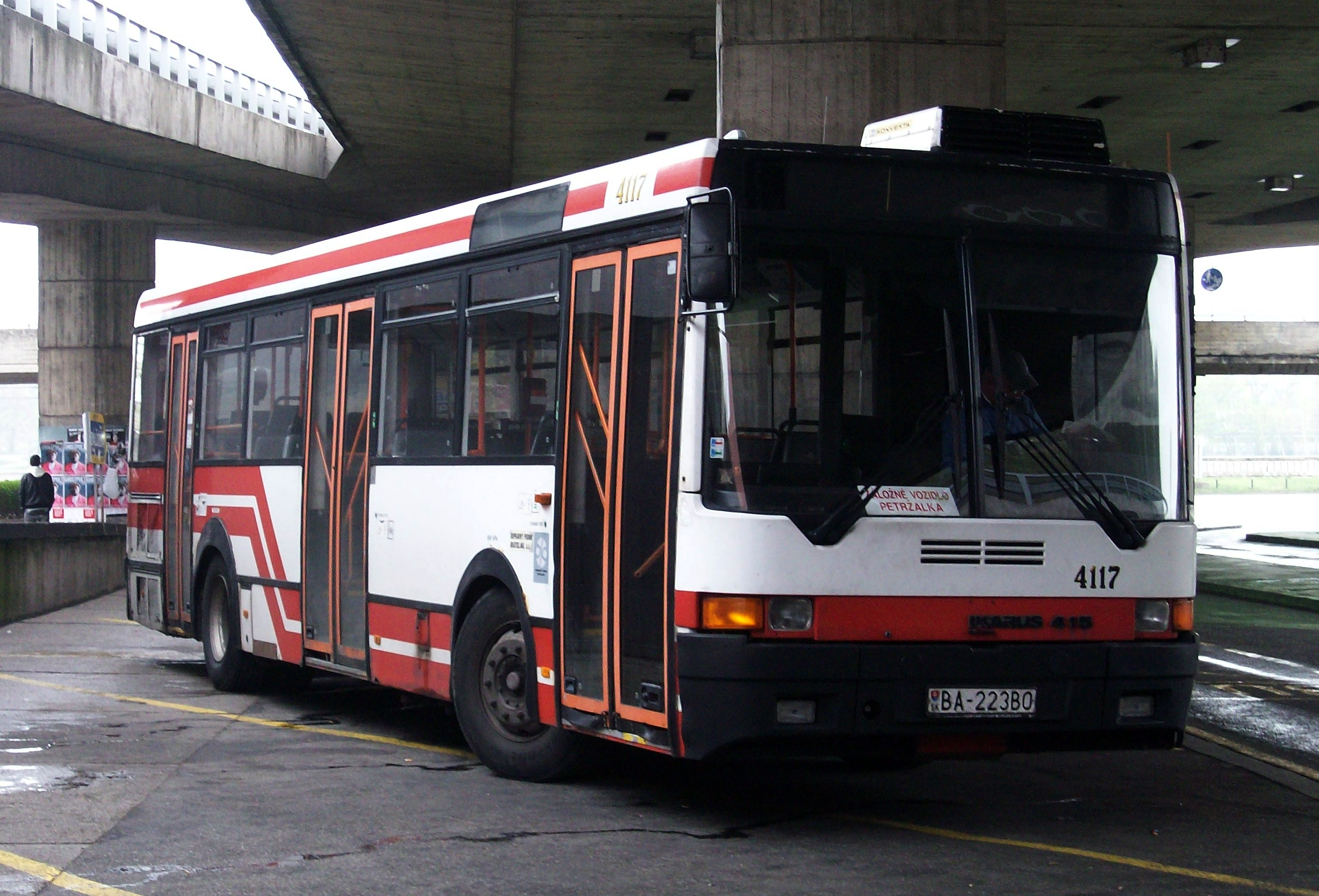
A 2nd generation Ikarus 415 in Bratislava, Slovakia.

The other specialised new model family was to create a variety of vehicles for city and suburban transportation. The first prototype was built in 1979, under the name Ikarus 413.K1, which was followed by almost a dozen other experimental vehicles in the early 1980s.

By 1984, the development was finished, and production could start with the Ikarus 415 model's first generation. Although it was a well built model with the era's required technology, not many orders were received, because Ikarus's main market was in the Eastern Bloc, which just started to suffer economically. Not the Soviet Union nor Hungarian companies could afford the more expensive, more modern model family, and most of them decided to demand to continue the production of the much cheaper, but already 14 year-old models of the 200-series. The company had to wait until 1992 for the actual mass production of the model family, when BKV Zrt. ordered 140 units of the Ik 415 model. By then, the company had long developed the articulated version of the model, bearing the name Ikarus 435, but this vehicle also had to wait until 1994 for the first major order, namely from the same transportation company.

==== Ikarus 500-series ====
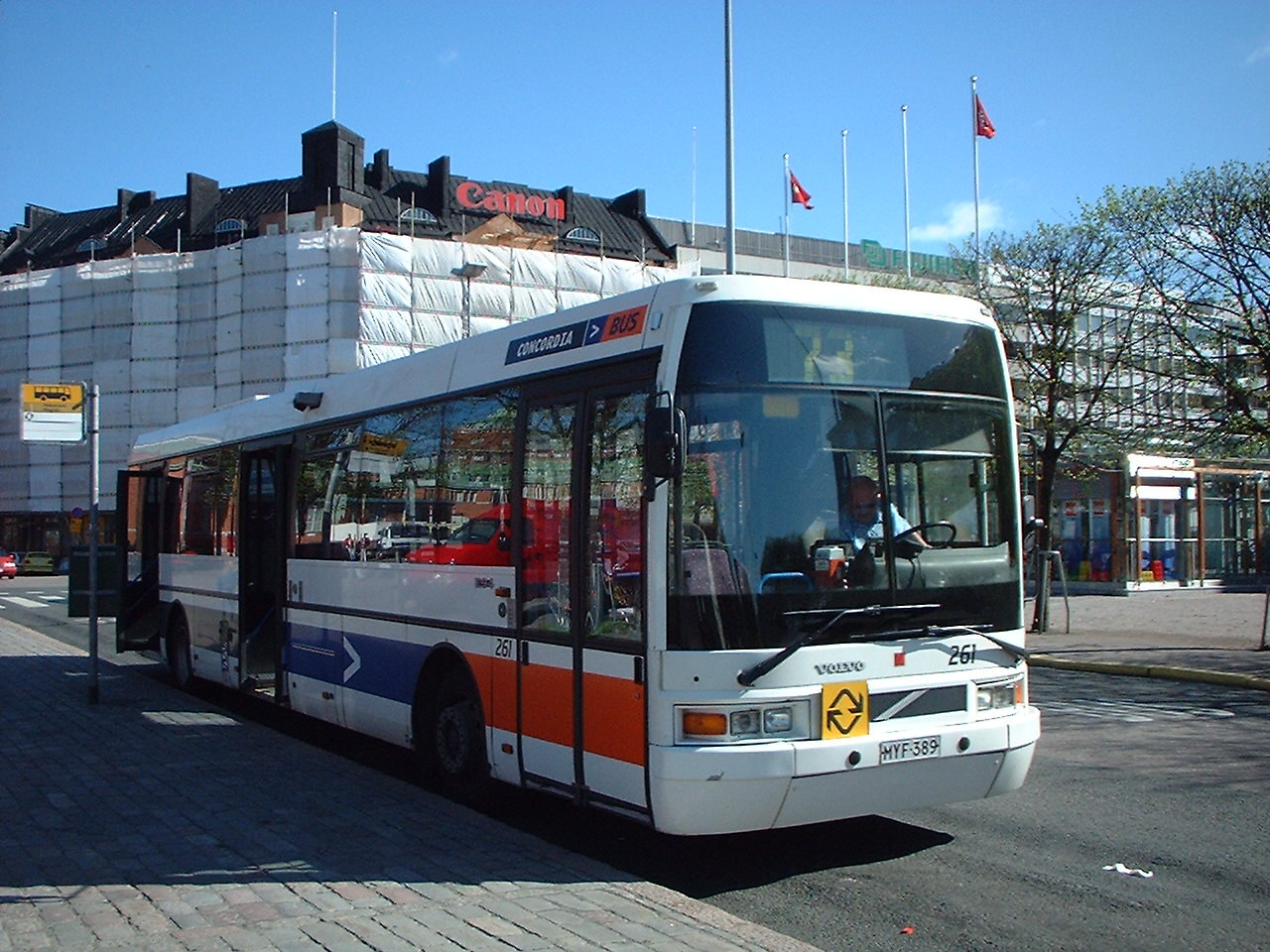
Concordia Bus Ikarus E94 at Hakaniemi metro station in Helsinki, Finland

This Ikarus family of models was produced between 1979 and 1999 as the company's answer for the request of various developing countries, as they had a need for cheap, small and versatile vehicles. These units did not follow any major design rules. Even submodels could look very differently from each other. What these vehicles all had in common was that they were not built with unibody construction, but rather on various chassis. Many companies sold their products to Ikarus, which then built superstructures on them, these include Volkswagen, Avia, MAN, Renault and even Isuzu. Of all these models, Ikarus 543 was produced in the largest numbers, more than 2100 units were exported.

==== Buses by VöV and STLF-regulations ====
In 1971, the company decided to try itself on the West German market, where the very strict Verband Öffentlicher Verkehrsbetriebe VöV-regulations for 11 meter long buses were in work. These regulations demanded a certain look and construction of the vehicles, which resulted in very similar, almost doppelganger like buses from the various companies. The Hungarian company developed and exported the Ikarus 190, while the competition produced models like the Mercedes-Benz O305, MAN SL200 or the Magirus-Deutz SH110. The Ikarus' model proved to be prominent, which resulted in an order from the German operator Verkehrsbetriebe Hamburg-Holstein (VHH) with a total of 154 units delivered between 1973 and 1977 for service in Hamburg, Geesthacht, Reinbek, Neumünster and Norderstedt. 100 more units were exported to the Kuwait Public Transport Company in 1977.

From 1976, Sweden also started to be curious about the Ikarus models, so they ordered a small number of them, with major modifications to fit some of the VöV-regulations' Swedish counterparts, the STLF-, or Svenskkollektivtrafik-regulations. The new model was designated as Ikarus 194 and on the customer's request was built on Swedish platforms (like Volvo B10M and Scania N112), instead of using a unibody construction. The first series was followed by a number of others up until 1987 and even resulted in the development of an articulated version, the Ikarus 196.

=== The fall of Ikarus (1989–2003) ===
Ikarus 417
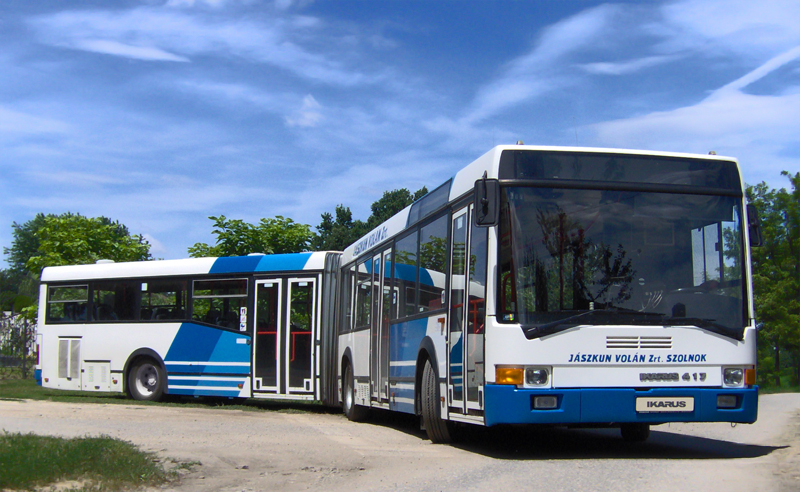
- The world's first articulated bus with full low-floor construction

Overview
- Type: city/suburban bus
- Production: 1995–2002

Body and chassis
- Doors: 3–4
- Chassis: self supporting

Powertrain
- Engine: Cummins; C8.3-290K (first engine)
- Power output: 293 hp
- Transmission: ZF 4HP 500

Dimensions
- Length: 17.63–17.97 m
- Width: 2,5 m
- Height: 2.8 m
- Curb weight: 15 t

Chronology
- Predecessor: Ikarus 435

With the fall of the Communist Bloc, Ikarus's existence approached a crisis as well. Many of the once very close customers, including Russia, suddenly turned away from the Hungarian company, which resulted in a looming disaster. The other major problem was that the remaining customers still didn't want to even hear about "newer" models of the 300- and 400-series. The third issue was that in 1990, the Soviet Union was on the brink of bankruptcy; the Hungarian government's response to this was an immediate halt on exports to the USSR. This resulted in over 1000 already produced Ikarus 200-series buses getting stranded in the factory's yard. That event was a major loss for the company. Ikarus also suffered a blow when Germany withdrew all its orders for the year 1990. These events forced Ikarus to cut off relationships with many of its suppliers and start producing these parts in its own factories. Although being a logical step towards protecting the company, it resulted in the fate of many other Hungarian businesses, including Csepel.

In spite of the numerous setbacks, Ikarus managed to stay above water, partially thanks to some newly conquered markets such as the United Kingdom. At the very end of the 1980s, Ikarus managed to export some of the 300-series models to the island, which built a basis for further partnership. From 1990 to 2001, the company developed and exported three models exclusively for the UK, the last of which was designed in 2000, named the Ikarus 489 Polaris and was a very up-to-date, modern vehicle.

Ikarus continued developing new models up until it went out of business. In 1993, the company built its first fully low-floored model, the Ikarus 411. With this vehicle, Ikarus was among the first companies to announce such a model. The first fully low-floored bus was the Van Hool A300 in 1991. Nonetheless, only a limited number of the model was produced, mainly because the bus was only 11 metres long, which, at the time, was not considered very practical. The company realised the issue and developed the successor of the model, the Ikarus 412, which was 12 metres long. On the other hand, Ikarus was the company that produced the first fully low-floored articulated bus in the world. It was Ikarus 417, which, due to its modern features, was very popular at first, and the German city of Wuppertal immediately ordered 17 units. The success of the model did not last long, though, because it had some recurring mechanical issues. As a result, only 32 units were sold over the next 7 years.

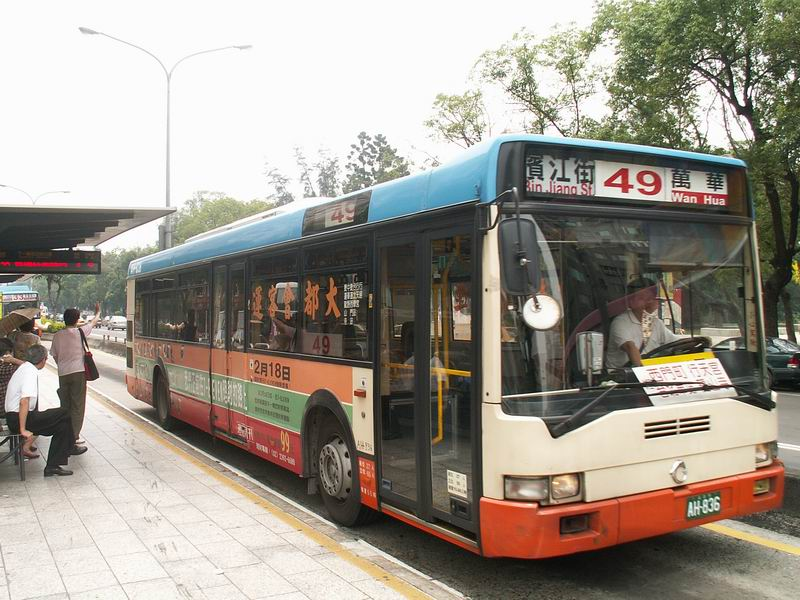
An Ikarus 412 in 2002 in Taiwan imported by Irisbus

In 1998, a refurbished version of the old 200-series was developed, called the Classic-series. The old models received redesigned fronts/backs and new, more efficient Rába D10 or Detroit Diesel S50 engines. The Classic-series proved to be a success, since the Eastern and Hungarian customers were glad to buy the newer versions of the familiar models, while Ikarus also gained somewhat more income on producing them.

In 1999, the French Irisbus bought the already ailing Ikarus, which, from this point on, started its downfall. Irisbus had no long-term plan with the brand itself, it was mostly pushing for Ikarus's factories and markets. In 2003, the French majority ownership concluded that it could not acquire these markets and decided that, after closing down the factory in Budapest in 2000, it should end the whole company.

The last vehicles to be produced by the company were three Ikarus 280s, which left the factory of Székesfehérvár in October 2003.

=== From 2004 ===
==== Legal disputes ====
In 2006, the entrepreneur-owned Magyar Busz Kft. was founded and bought the Székesfehérvár site and the production rights from Irisbus. Between 2010 and 2015, in cooperation with ARC (Auto Rad Control) Kft. from Szigetszentmiklós, Gábor Széles revived Ikarus bus production and acquired the name Ikarus as a trademark for the new buses. IKARUS Járműtechnika Kft. and the other companies of the IKARUS group owned by Gábor Széles (IKARUS GLOBÁL Zrt., IKARUS ELECTRIC MOTORCARS Zrt.) are divisions of Műszertechnika-Holding Zrt. Also in 2006, Ikarus Egyedi Kft. was founded, and this company also registered the brand name on June 30, 2016. Not long after, a lawsuit to establish a trademark infringement and its legal consequences was started.

In 2017-2018, several trademark application applications were submitted for the name Ikarus. On September 11 and 28, 2017, CSM Holding Kft. from Rábacsécsény (land, air or water transport means; bus; trolleybus, then military transport vehicles; body production), On the 27th, Attila Géza Bradács, from Kehidakustány (travel organization; excursion and tour organization), and on November 13, Műszertechnika Holding Zrt. (transport and transport equipment, including motor vehicles, automobiles, dump trucks, trucks, tractors, bodies and their parts and accessories), which in 2018 registered on December 6. Back in 2018 Gábor Széles's company filed a trademark infringement lawsuit against Ikarus Autóbusz Gyártó Egyedi Kft., as it is not the legal successor of the bus factory, and a legal dispute arose between them regarding ownership of the name.

In the summer of 2018, the main owner Ikarus Egyedi Kft. (formerly MABI-Bus), which also owns Evopro Holding, initiated bankruptcy proceedings against it, from which the minority owners (Lanta Kft. and Albatric Kft., like Ikarus Egyedi Kft.) also distanced themselves, and in October it started liquidation of the company group, it did not fulfill its orders, there was also a problem with the previous prototypes (hybrid, electric, gas and trolley-driven composite type C Modulók).

==== Another reorganization (from 2018) ====
The company was reorganized in 2018, and before 2021 the company produced 170 diesel buses.

The Ikarus 120e was presented at the Greentech 2021 sustainability trade show, the first purely electric bus designed and manufactured in Hungary with European type approval. Two important elements of the model come from China: the battery (manufactured by CATL) and the drive system (the work of the large corporation CRRC). However, the bus is entirely Hungarian in design: both the exterior and interior design are the work of Hungarian specialists, the assembly of the body and the installation of the drive system also take place in Székesfehérvár, and the mechanical engineering and electronics are also Hungarian. It was made in both a solo and an articulated version. The factory in Székesfehérvár employs many old professionals, some of whom even worked at the old Ikarus. The engineers have also developed a charging system integrated with an energy storage, which can be charged either from a solar panel or a wind farm, but also from the electrical network, thus ensuring that vehicles can be charged with high performance even with a relatively lower power network. In addition to the domestic market, the buses were also sold abroad.

== Subsidiaries ==
Ikarus E94
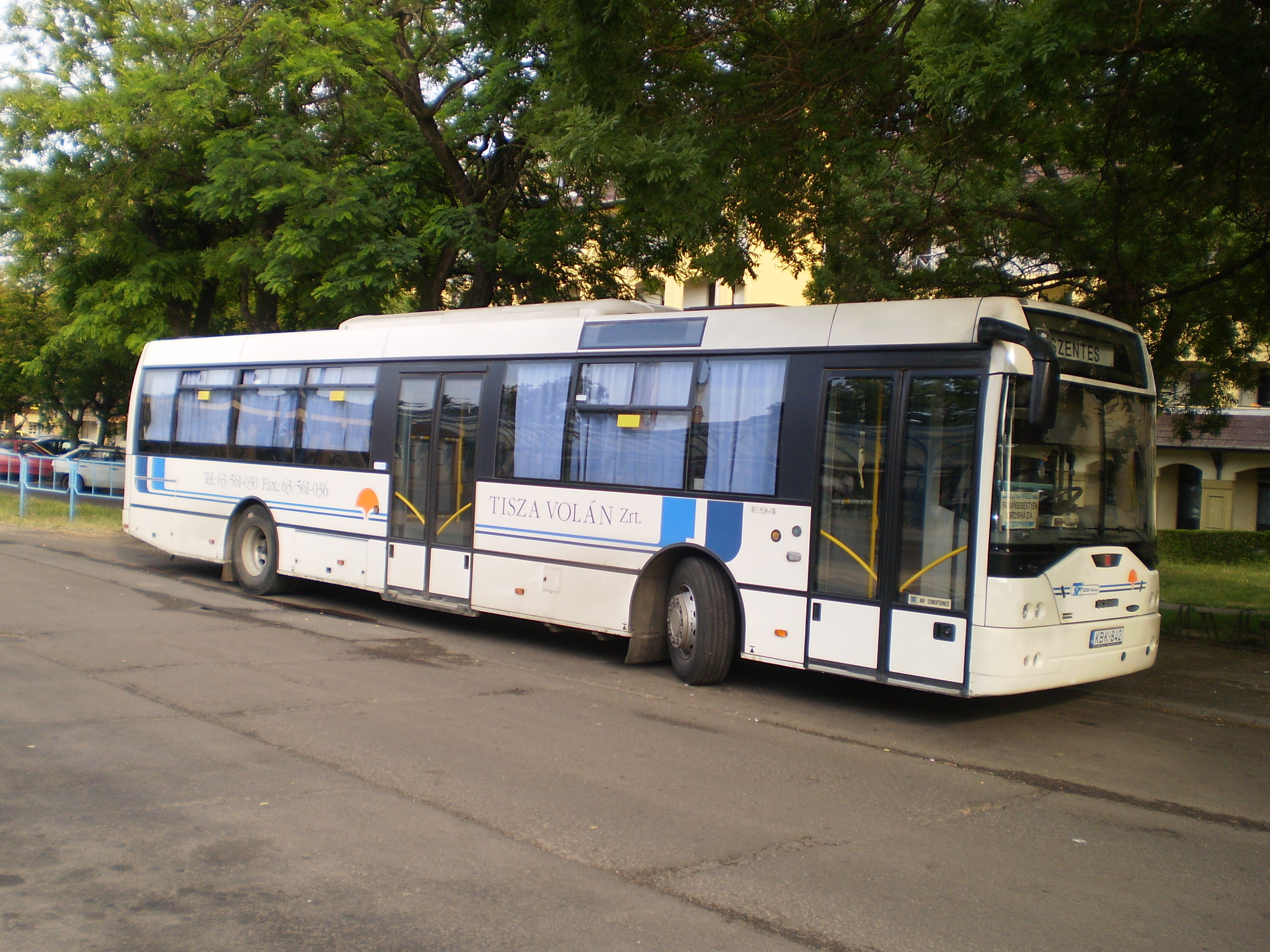
- An Ikarus E94 with Scania chassis

Overview
- Type: city/suburban
- Production: 1995–2007

Body and chassis
- Doors: 2–3
- Chassis: Scania or Rába

Powertrain
- Engine: Scania DSC11 71
- Power output: 234 hp
- Transmission: ZF S6-120U

Dimensions
- Length: 12 m
- Width: 2,5 m
- Height: 3,19 m

=== Ikarus EAG (1967/1989–2007) ===
This part of Ikarus' history starts in 1967, when the company decided to establish a smaller plant, where the unique or small numbered models could be developed and produced. It became the Ikarus Egyedi Gyáregység (Ikarus Unique Plant). Many models for the Scandinavian countries were constructed here.

==== E-series ====
In 1989, the company, due to the success of the plant, decided to create it as a subsidiary company, which resulted in a new name: Ikarus Egyedi Autóbuszgyár, or Ikarus EAG (Ikarus Unique Autobus Factory). The EAG started to develop its own, higher-quality coaches and buses on chassis called the E-series and became a considerable exporter primarily to the Scandinavian and Western markets.

Although being successful and receiving stable income, in 2007 Irisbus eventually chose to close down Ikarus EAG as well.

=== American-Ikarus (1980/1989–1993) ===
During the 1980s, Ikarus successfully exported c. 500 of the Ikarus 286 to the US (as the Crown-Ikarus 286) and Canada (as the Orion-Ikarus 286). Later on Ikarus created a subsidiary, the American Ikarus in order to ensure production on the continent. Eventually and partly because of the mother company's bad situation, in 1993 American Ikarus broke away from Ikarus and took the name North American Bus Industries, or NABI. The new company later managed to become one of the most prominent American bus manufacturers.

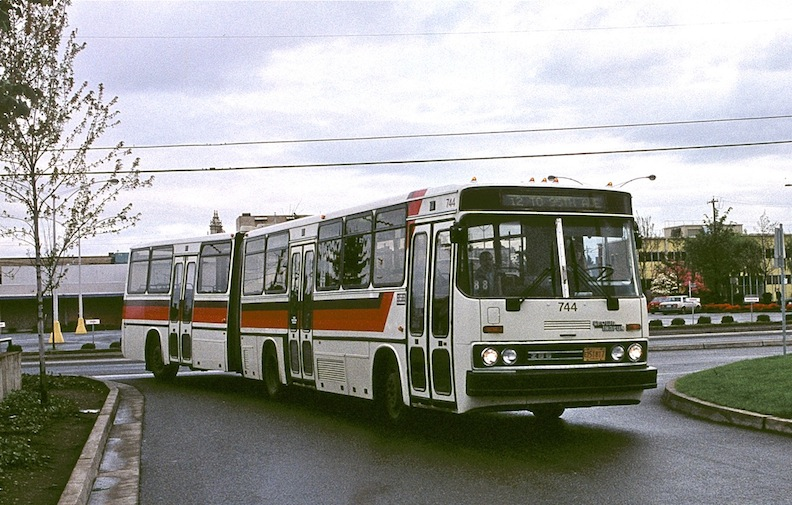
Ikarus 286, in Portland, Oregon, USA

NABI continued production of transit buses, largely based on the Ikarus 416 and 436 models, until 2013, when New Flyer Industries bought NABI and eventually closed it in 2015.

== Bus and trolleybus models ==
=== Current models (including the concept models) ===
- Ikarus 250
- Ikarus 260
- Ikarus 280
- Ikarus 415T
- Ikarus 415
- Ikarus 120e
- Ikarus 180e (coming soon)

== See also ==
- Orion Bus Industries
- Successors to Ikarus (Hungarian company)

== Bibliography ==
- Gerlei – Kukla – Lovász (2008). Az Ikarus évszázados története. Budapest, Maróti Könyvkereskedés és Könyvkiadó Kft. ISBN 9789639005853
