= Wagon =

Four wheeled vehicle pulled by draft animals

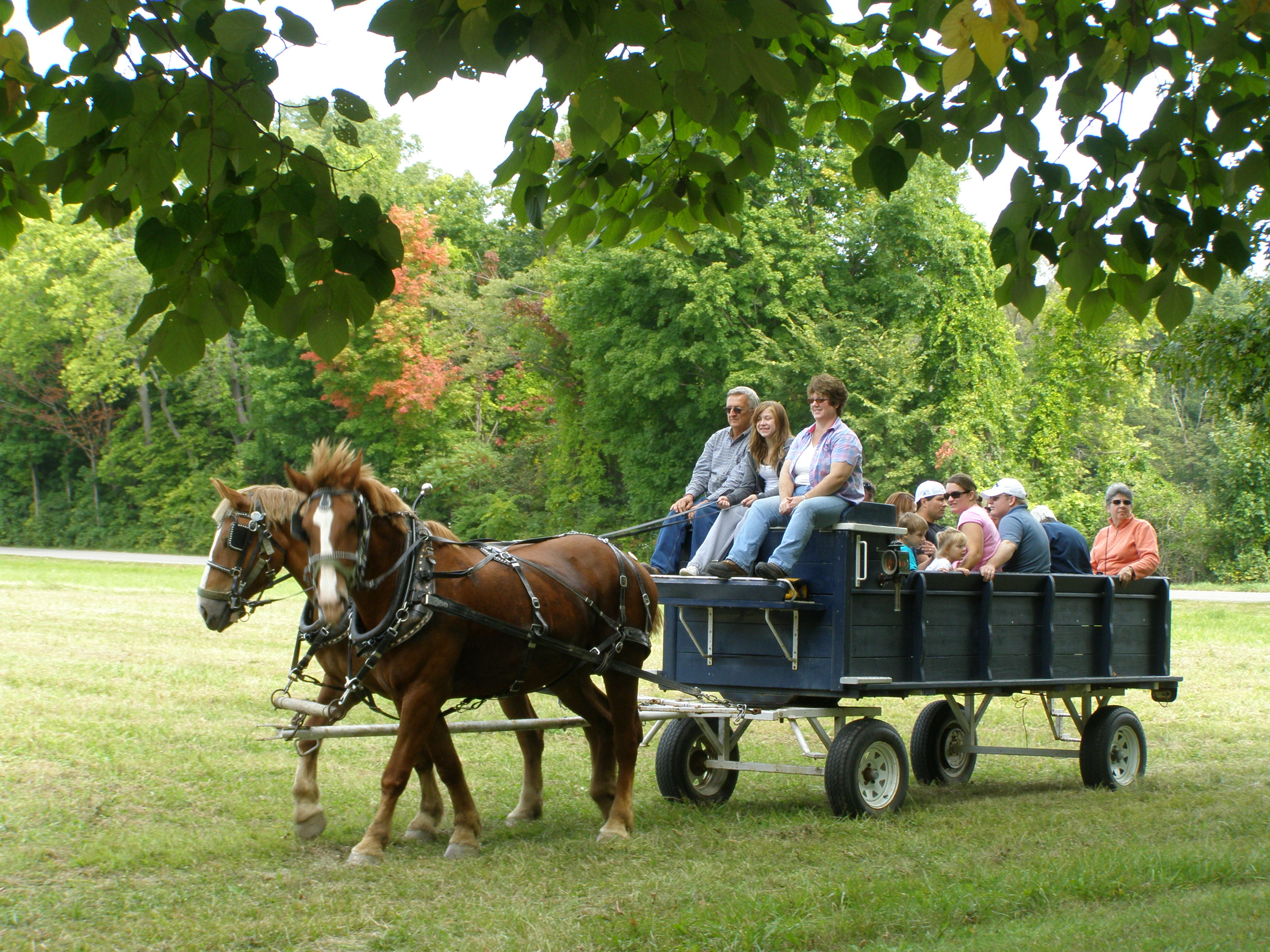
A modern horse-drawn pleasure wagon

A wagon (or waggon) is a heavy four-wheeled vehicle pulled by draft animals or on occasion by humans, used for transporting goods, commodities, agricultural materials, supplies and sometimes people.

Wagons are immediately distinguished from carts (which have two wheels) and from lighter four-wheeled vehicles primarily for carrying people, such as carriages. Wagons are often pulled by animals like horses, mules, and oxen, either a single animal, a pair, or larger teams. However, there are examples of human-propelled wagons, such as mining corfs.

A wagon was formerly called a wain and one who builds or repairs wagons is a wainwright. More specifically, a wain is a type of horse- or oxen-drawn, load-carrying vehicle, used for agricultural purposes rather than transporting people. A wagon or cart, usually four-wheeled; for example, a haywain, normally has four wheels, but the term has now acquired slightly poetical connotations, so is not always used with technical correctness. However, a two-wheeled "haywain" would be a hay cart, as opposed to a carriage. Wain is also an archaic term for a chariot. Wain can also be a verb, to carry or deliver, and has other meanings.

Contemporary or modern animal-drawn wagons may be of metal instead of wood and have automotive wheels with rubber tires instead of traditional wooden wheels.

A person who drives wagons is called a "wagoner", a "teamster", a "bullocky" (Australia & New Zealand), a "muleteer", or simply a "driver".

Wagons have served numerous purposes, with a variety of designs. As with motorized vehicles, some are designed to serve as many functions as possible, while others are highly specialized.

== Terminology and design ==
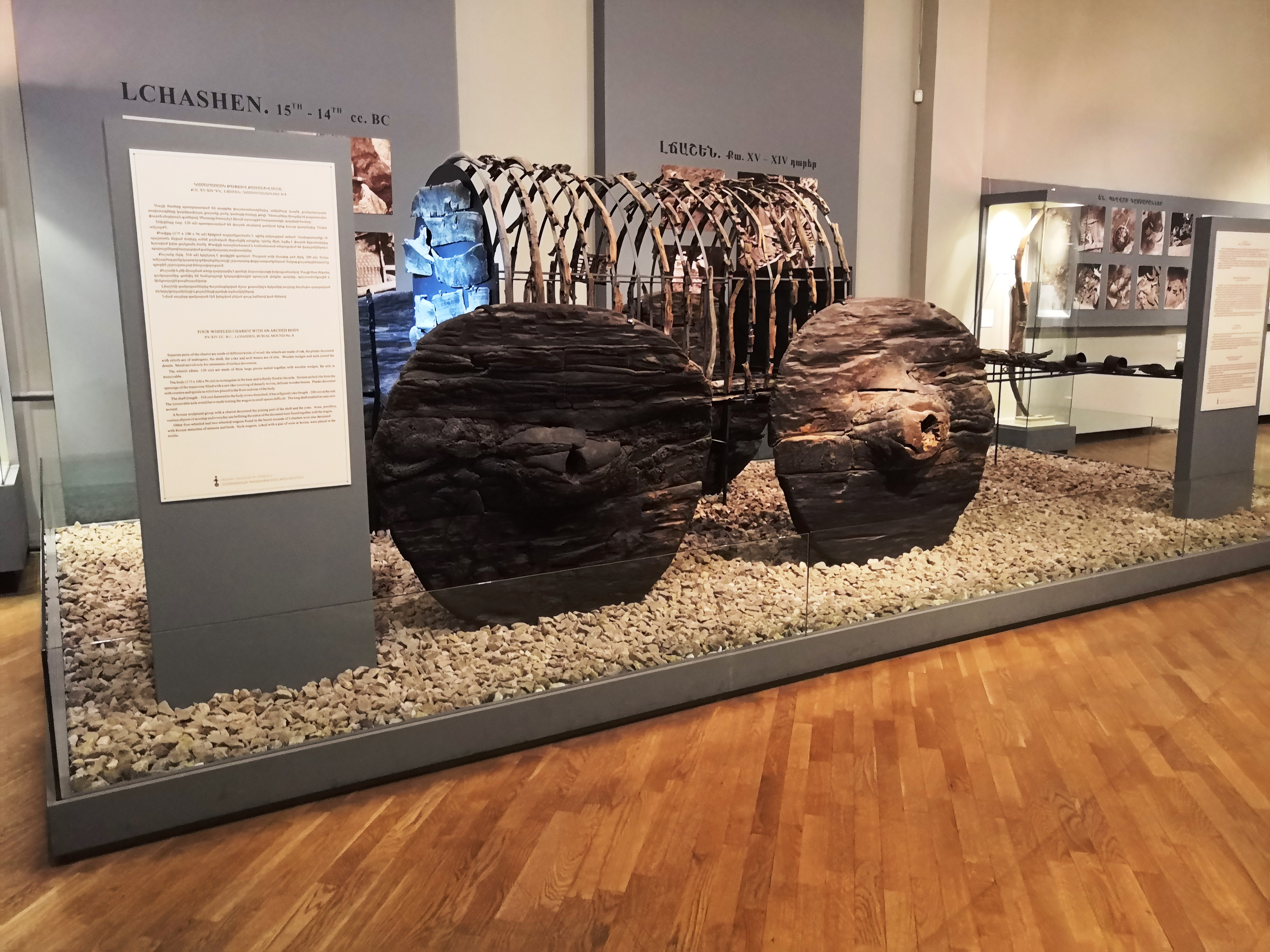
One of the two wagons in the History Museum of Armenia, the world's oldest known wagons.

The exact name and terminology used are often dependent on the design or shape of the wagon. If low and sideless it may be called a dray, trolley or float. When traveling over long distances and periods, wagons may be covered with cloth to protect their contents from the elements; these are "covered wagons". If it has high sides, with or without a permanent top, it may be called a "van". A wagon might be unsprung if ordinarily used over rough ground or cobbles.

A front axle assembly, in its simplest form, is an assembly of a short beam with a pivot plate, two wheels and spindles as well as a drawbar attached to this. A pin attaches the device to a horse-drawn vehicle making the turning radius smaller.

== Farm wagon ==
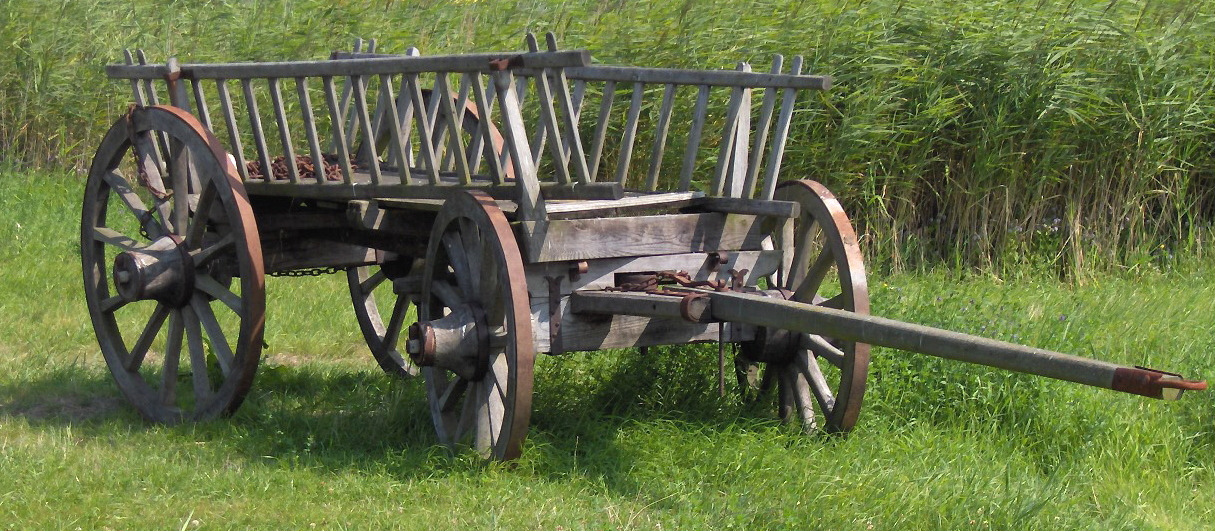
A ladder-wagon or hay wagon in Germany, of a type common throughout Europe (the leiterwagen). The sides are actually ladders attached to serve as containment of hay or grain, and may be removed, such as for hauling timber.

Farm wagons are built for general multi-purpose usage in an agricultural or rural setting. These include gathering hay, crops and wood, and delivering them to the farmstead or market. Wagons can also be pulled with tractors for easy transportation of those materials.

A common form found throughout Europe is the ladder wagon, a large wagon the sides of which consisted of ladders strapped in place to hold in hay or sheaves of grain, though these could be removed to serve other needs.

== Freight wagon ==
Freight wagons were used for the overland hauling of freight and bulk commodities. They were not designed for transporting people and were not built for comfort. Many were constructed without a driver's seat or bench, leaving the driver to walk alongside the wagon or ride atop one of the horses. Many freight wagons had a "lazyboard," a plank that could be pulled out for sitting upon, and then pushed back when not needed. In America, lazyboards were located on the left side and close to the brake because wagons were steered from the left side.

In the United States and Canada, the large, heavily built Conestoga wagon was a predominant form of freight wagon in the late 18th and 19th centuries, often used for hauling goods on the Great Wagon Road in the Appalachian Valley and across the Appalachian Mountains—not to be confused with covered wagons in general.

Even larger wagons were built, such as the twenty-mule team wagons, used for hauling borax from Death Valley, which could haul 36 short tons (32 long tons; 33 t) per pair. The wagons' bodies were 16 feet (4.88 m) long and 6 feet (1.83 m) deep; the rear wheels were 7 feet (2.13 m) in diameter, and the wagons weighed 7,800 pounds (3,500 kg) empty.

Freight wagons in the American West were hauled by oxen, mules or horses. Freight wagon teams would generally haul between three and thirty-five tons of freight when hauling to mining outposts. On the return, they would haul ore to steamboats or to railroad depots.

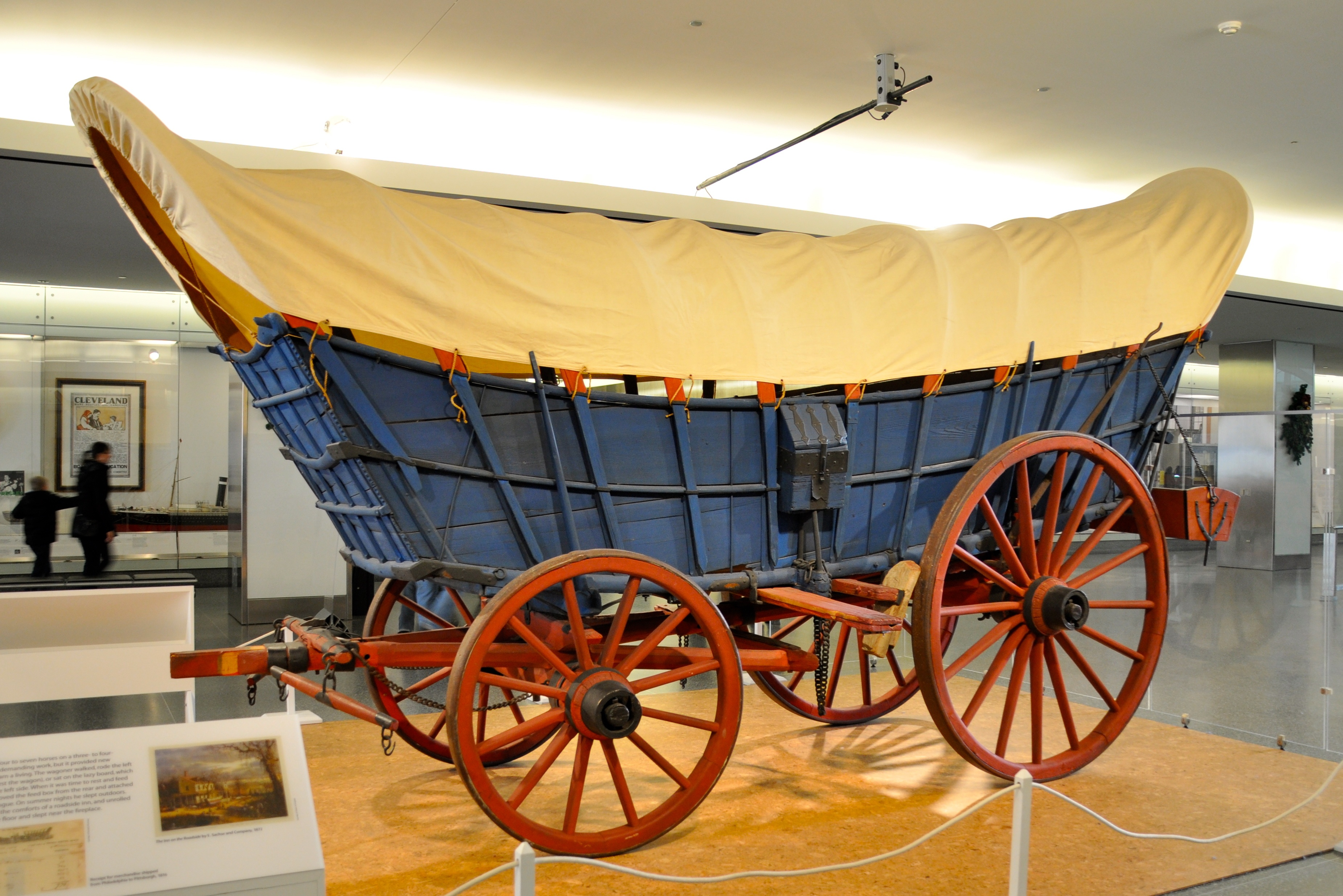
Conestoga wagon, USA 1840s

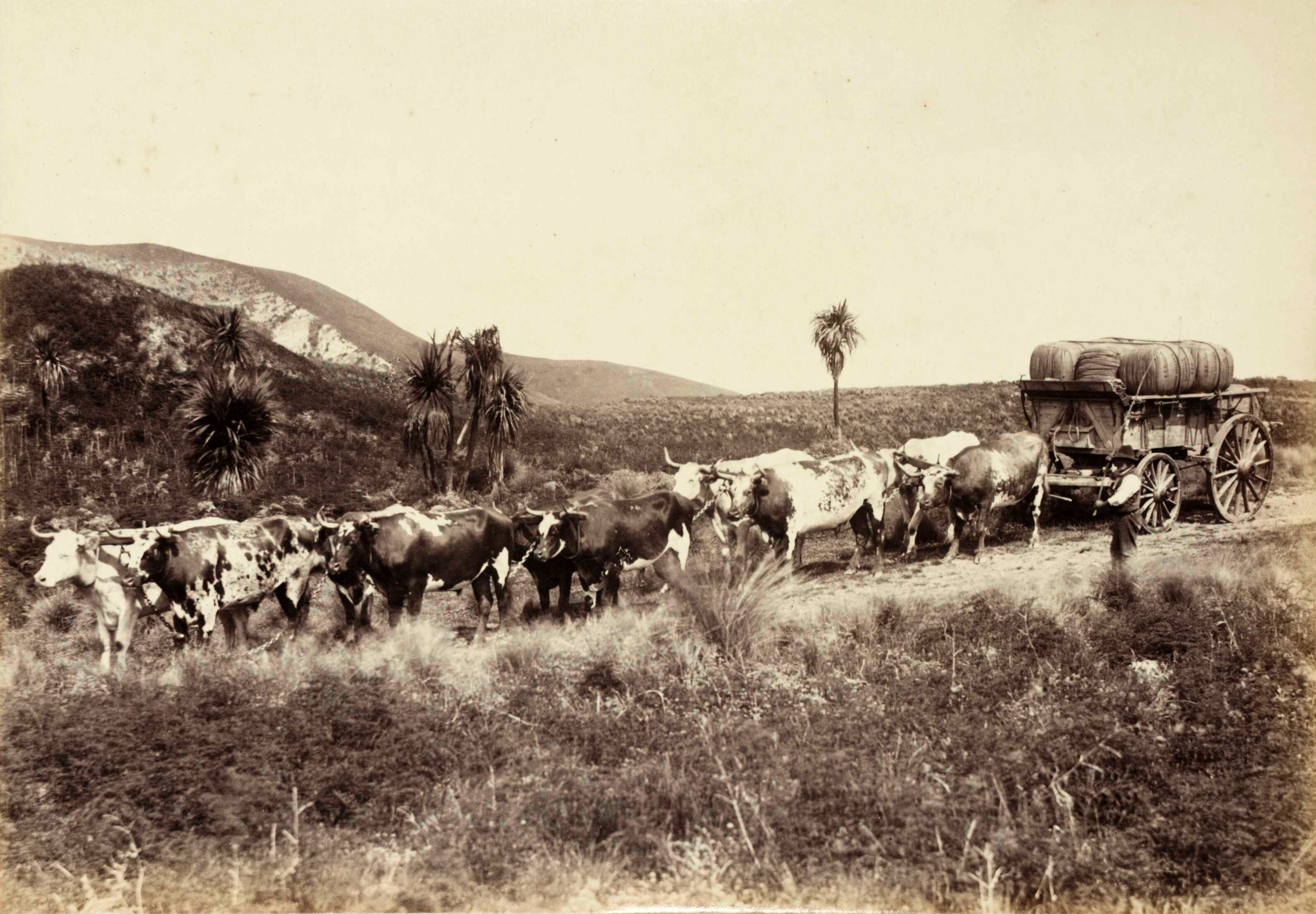
Ox-wagon hauling wool, New Zealand c. 1880

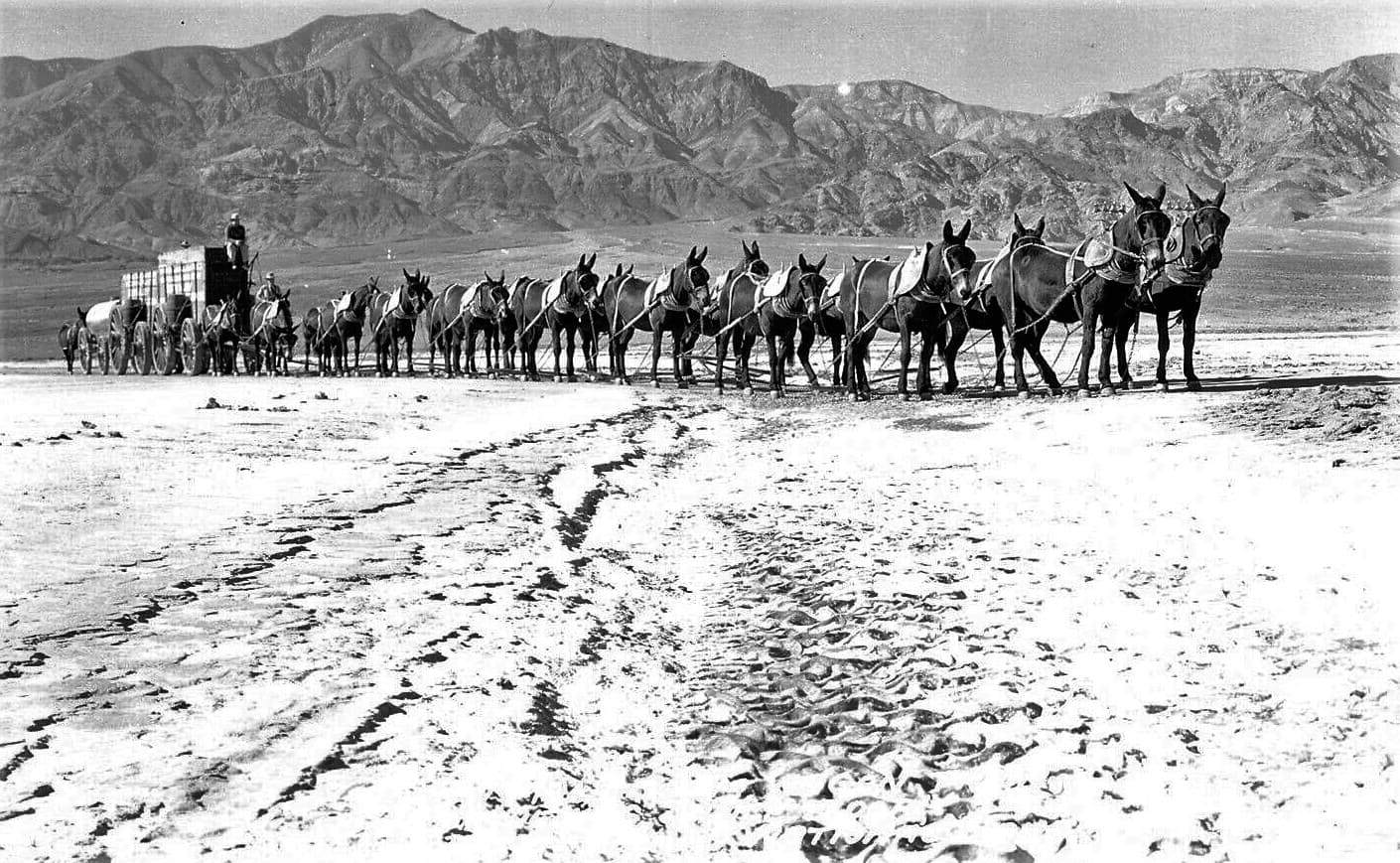
Twenty-mule team, Borax freight, USA 1880s

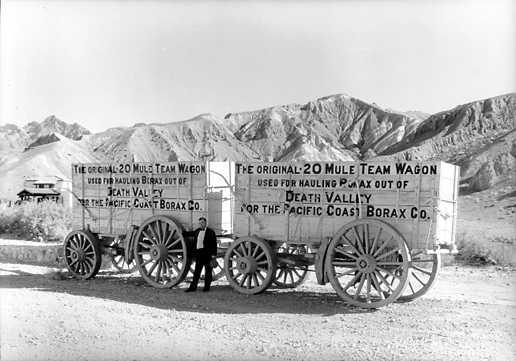
Borax wagons on display c. 1935

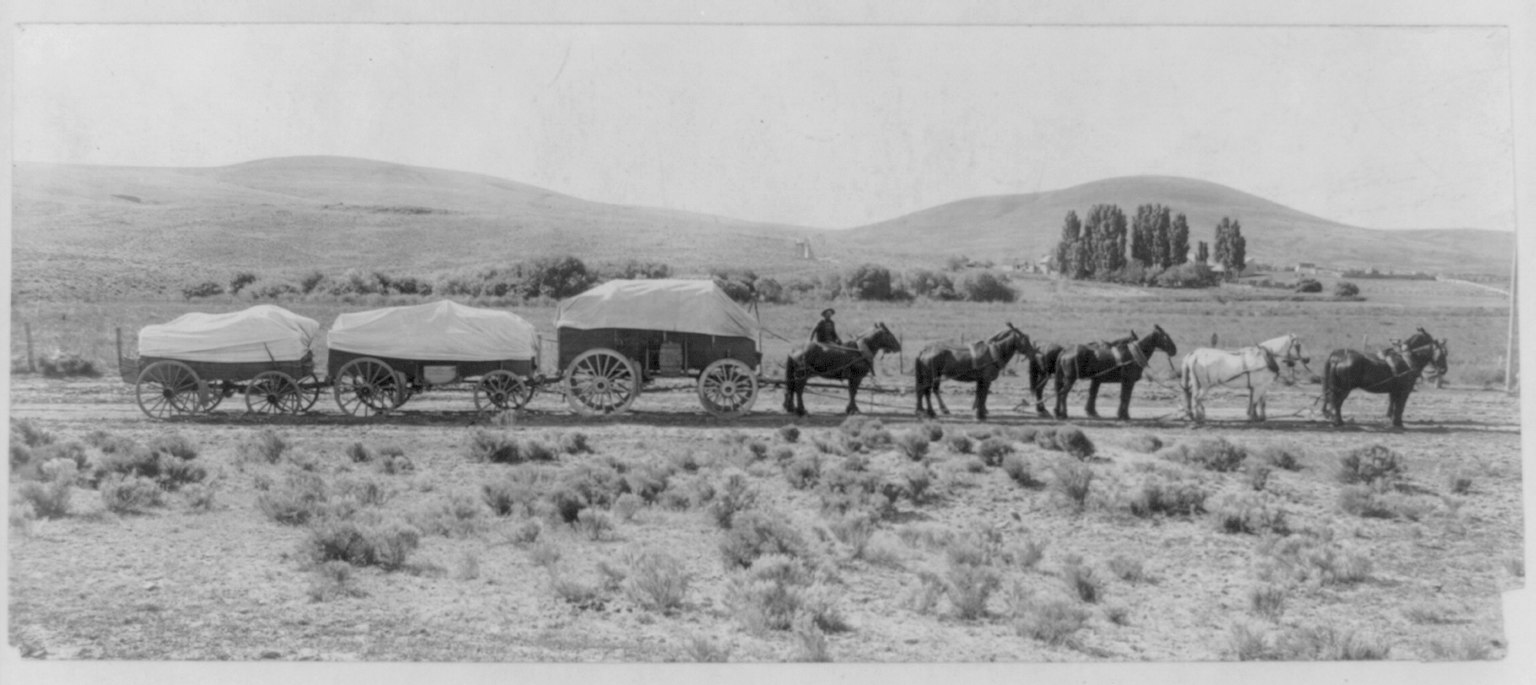
Freight wagons, USA 1905

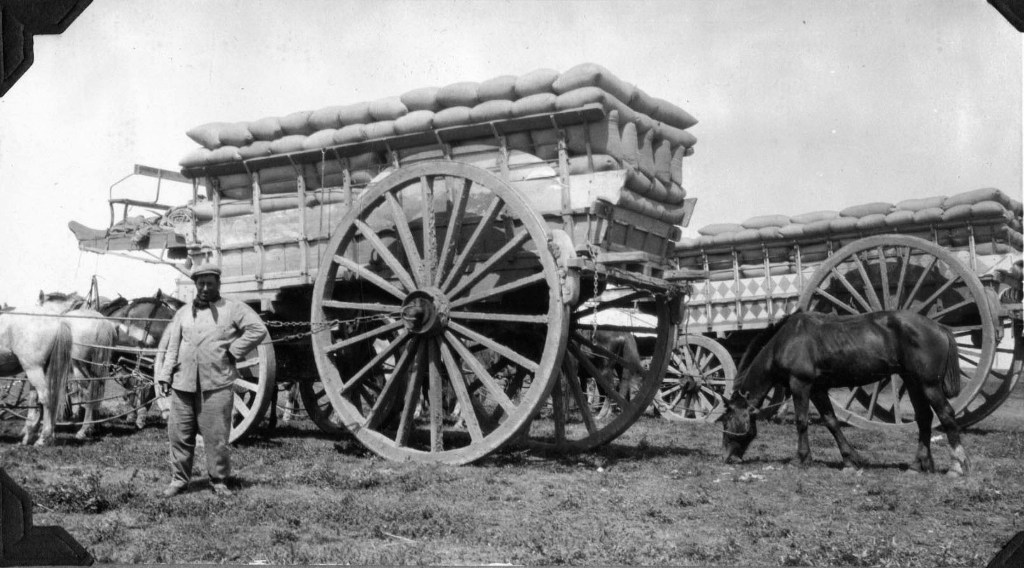
Freight wagons, Argentina 1920s

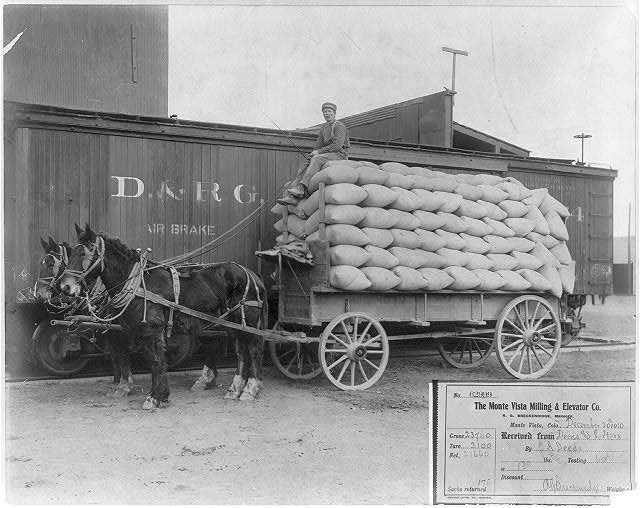
Load of wheat, USA 1910

== Industrial and commercial wagons ==
The trolley, lorry, and dray are short-haul vehicles for movement of goods—trolleys being the lightest and drays the heaviest. Trolleys and lorries (Note: There are many regional variations and spellings, including lorry, lorrie, lorries, lurry, rolly, rolley, rully, rulley, trolley, trolly, trolleys, trollies, and flats. Lorry was preferred over trolley in the North of England.) are usually open flatbeds with small wheels tucked under the deck which allow for tighter turning ability and for handling oversized objects that would overhang the platform. They were historically used for moving goods between rail yards, docks, warehouses, and city buildings, with low open decks for easy loading and unloading. Many lacked springs or seats, and drivers either walked beside the vehicle or stood or sat on the platform.

Drays are sturdier vehicles built to carry heavier loads. The term became strongly associated with the brewer's dray or beer wagon. In the UK, new and restored brewer's drays and market lorries compete in horse show classes for commercial and trade vehicles. In the US, draft horse shows include classes for teams of four, six, or eight matching horses harnessed to brewer's drays, called "hitch wagons", such as those used by the Budweiser Clydesdale teams.

Vehicles with sideboards often carried painted advertising, while flatbed types typically had a tall headboard bearing the proprietor's name.

Several of these horse-drawn vehicle names survived into the motorized era. In the UK, lorry is used in the same way as truck in the US. In the US, "dray" fell out of common use but "drayage" remains, referring to short-range hauling by truck, such as moving shipping containers from docks to regional warehouses. Trolley survives in the US for trams and trolleybuses, and in the UK for shopping carts.

Trolleys and lorries

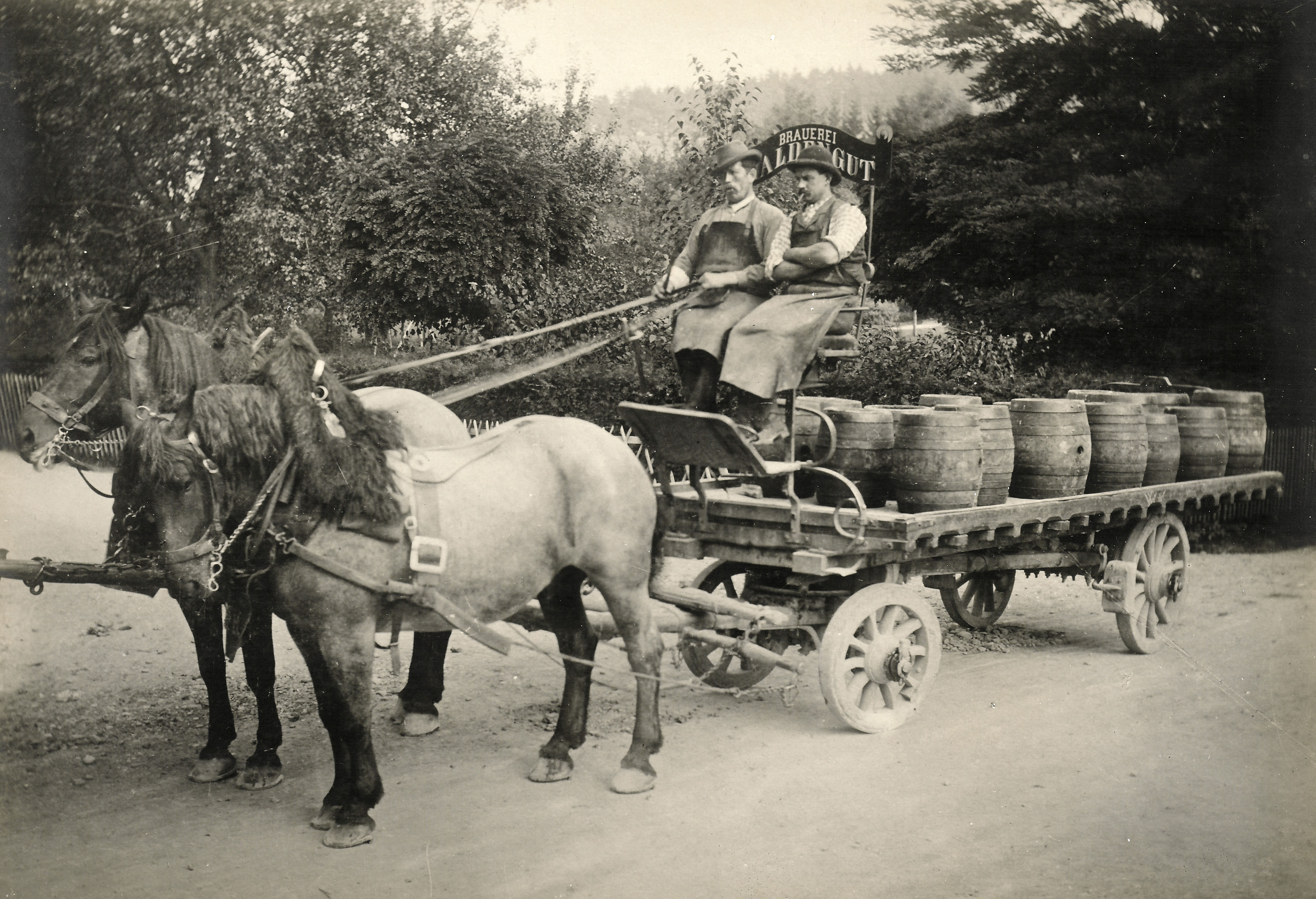
Switzerland 1892

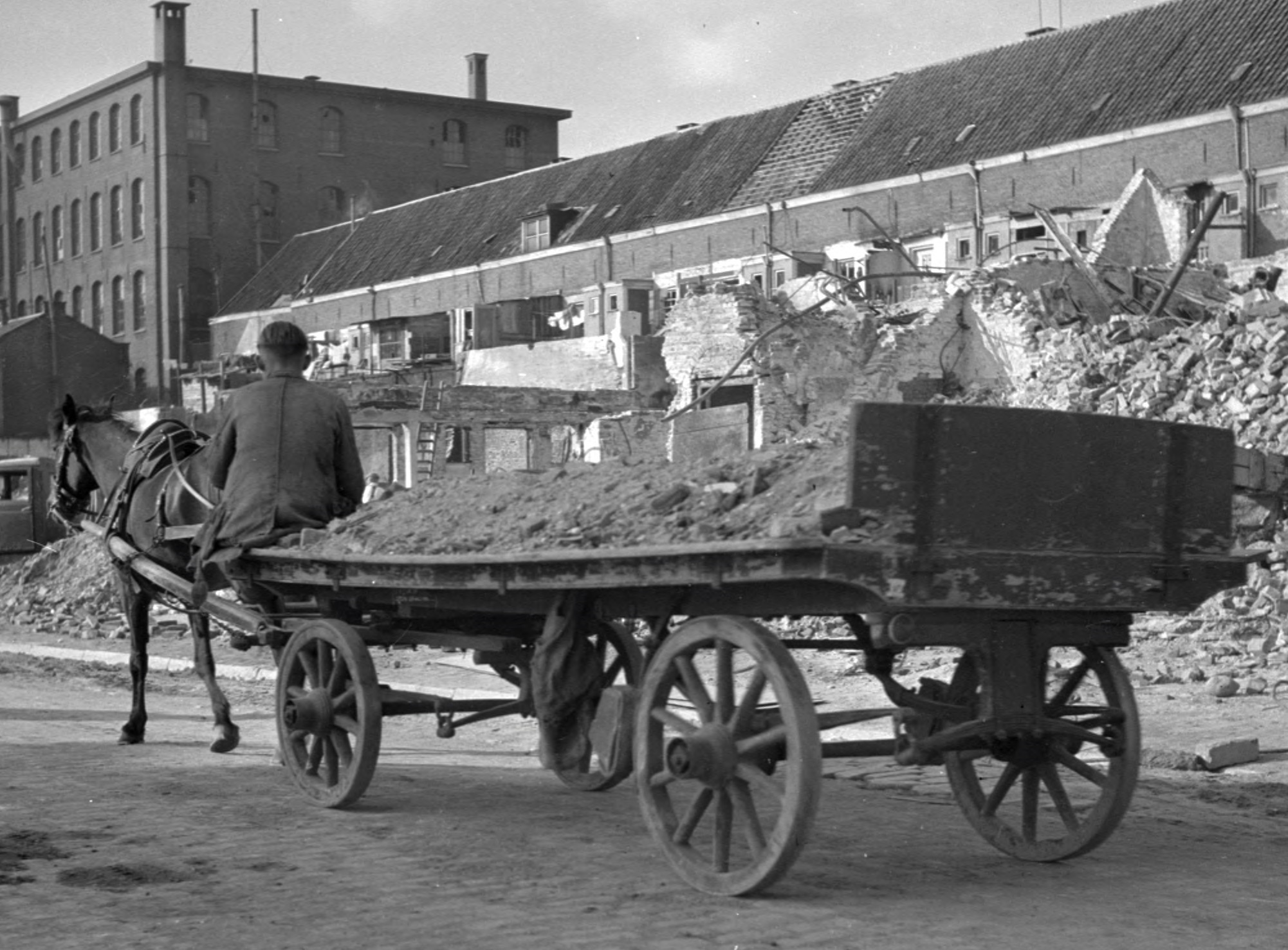
Netherlands 1940s

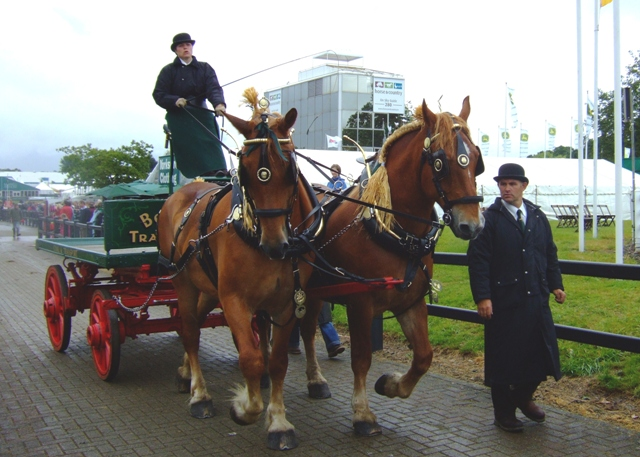
England 2008

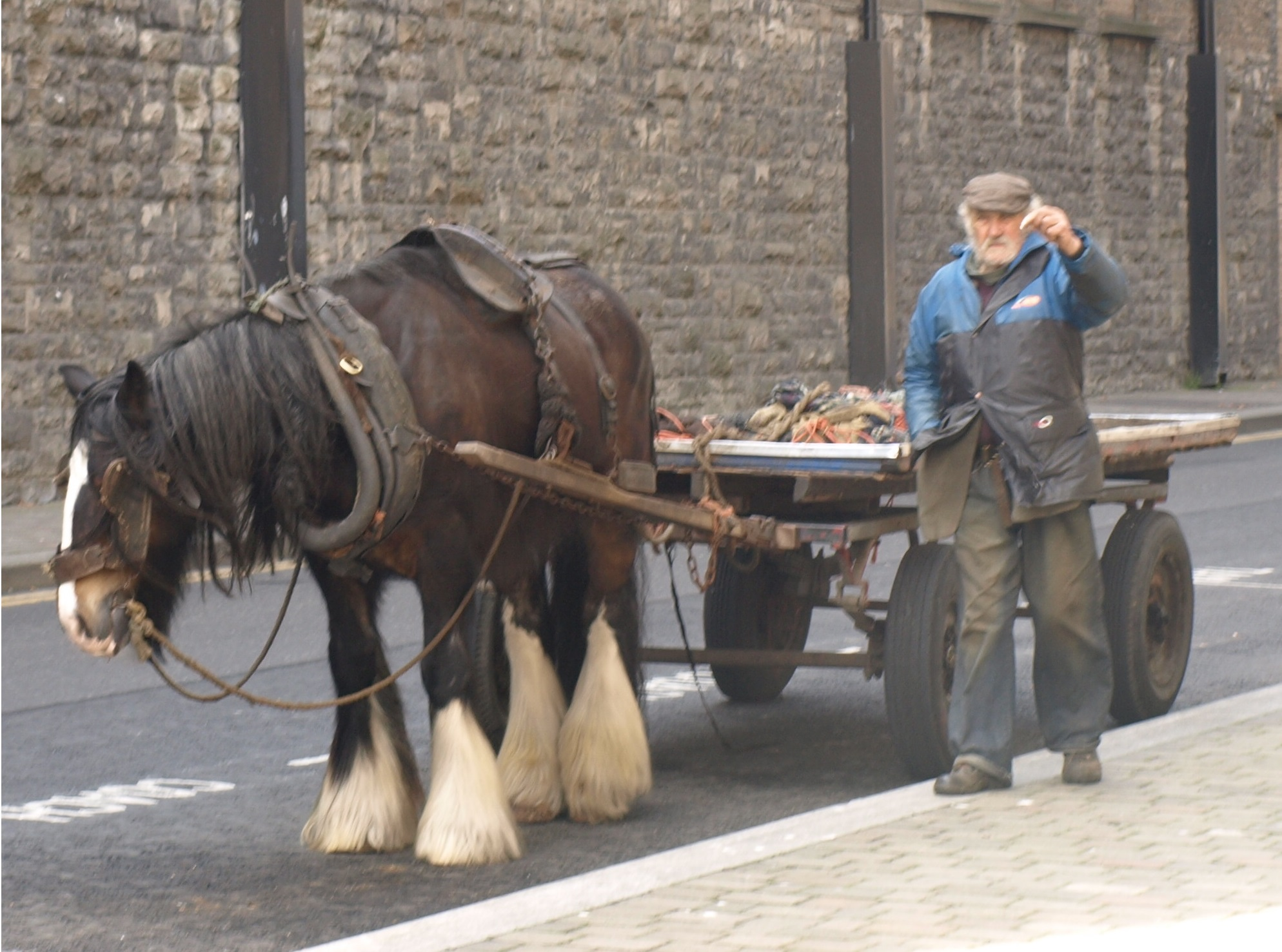
Ireland 2008
Drays

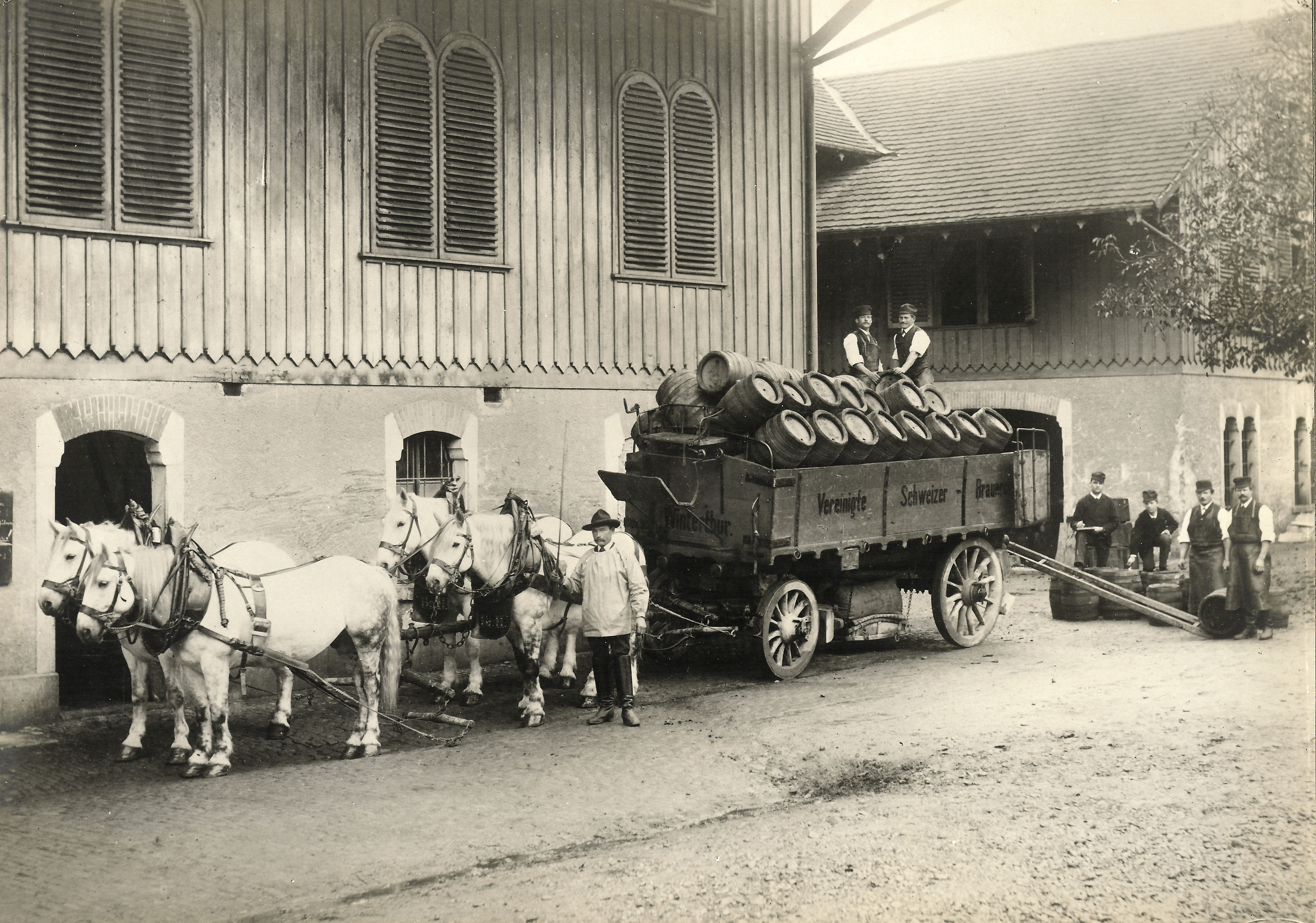
Switzerland 1889

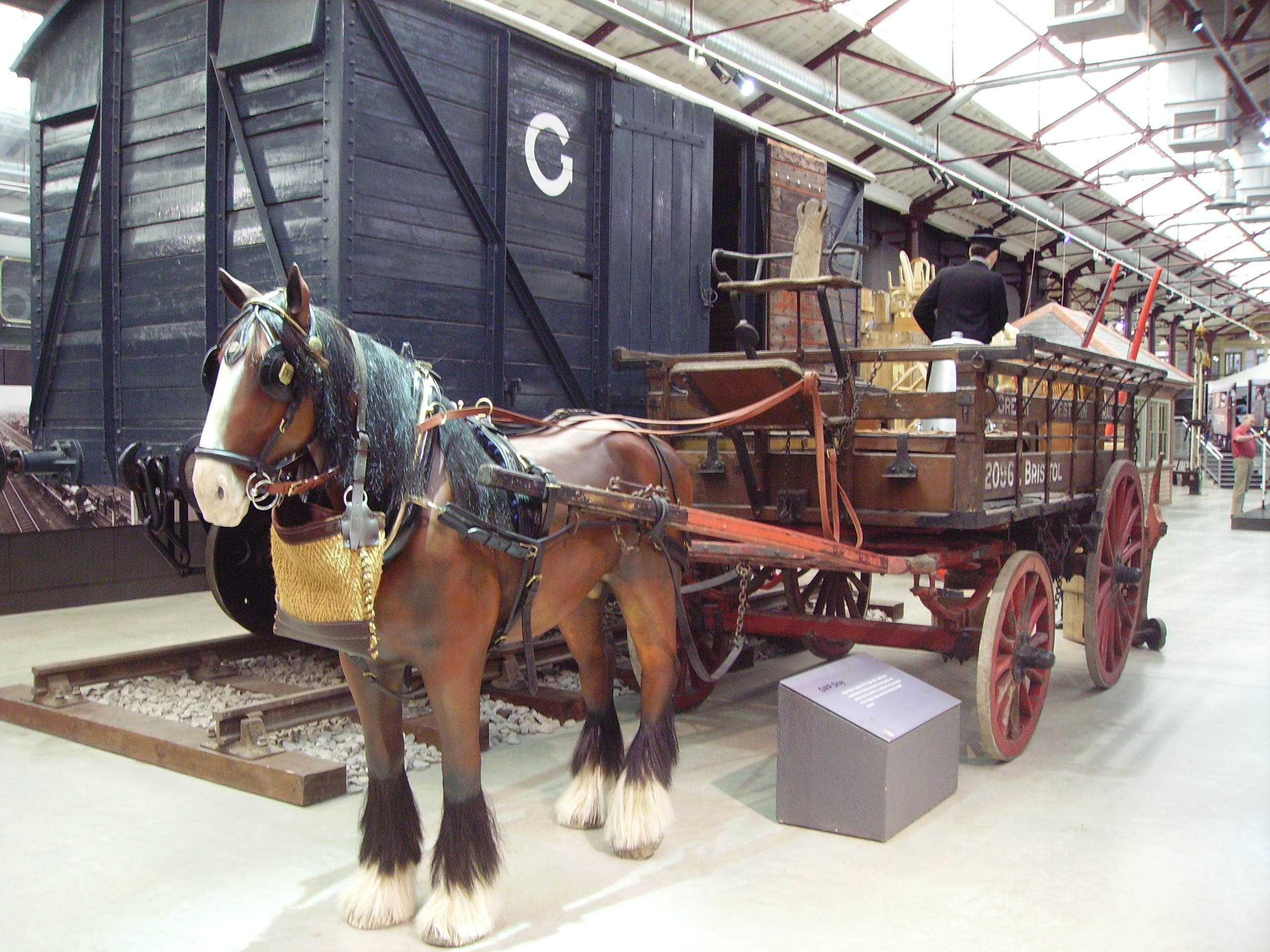
Dray (English museum 2006)

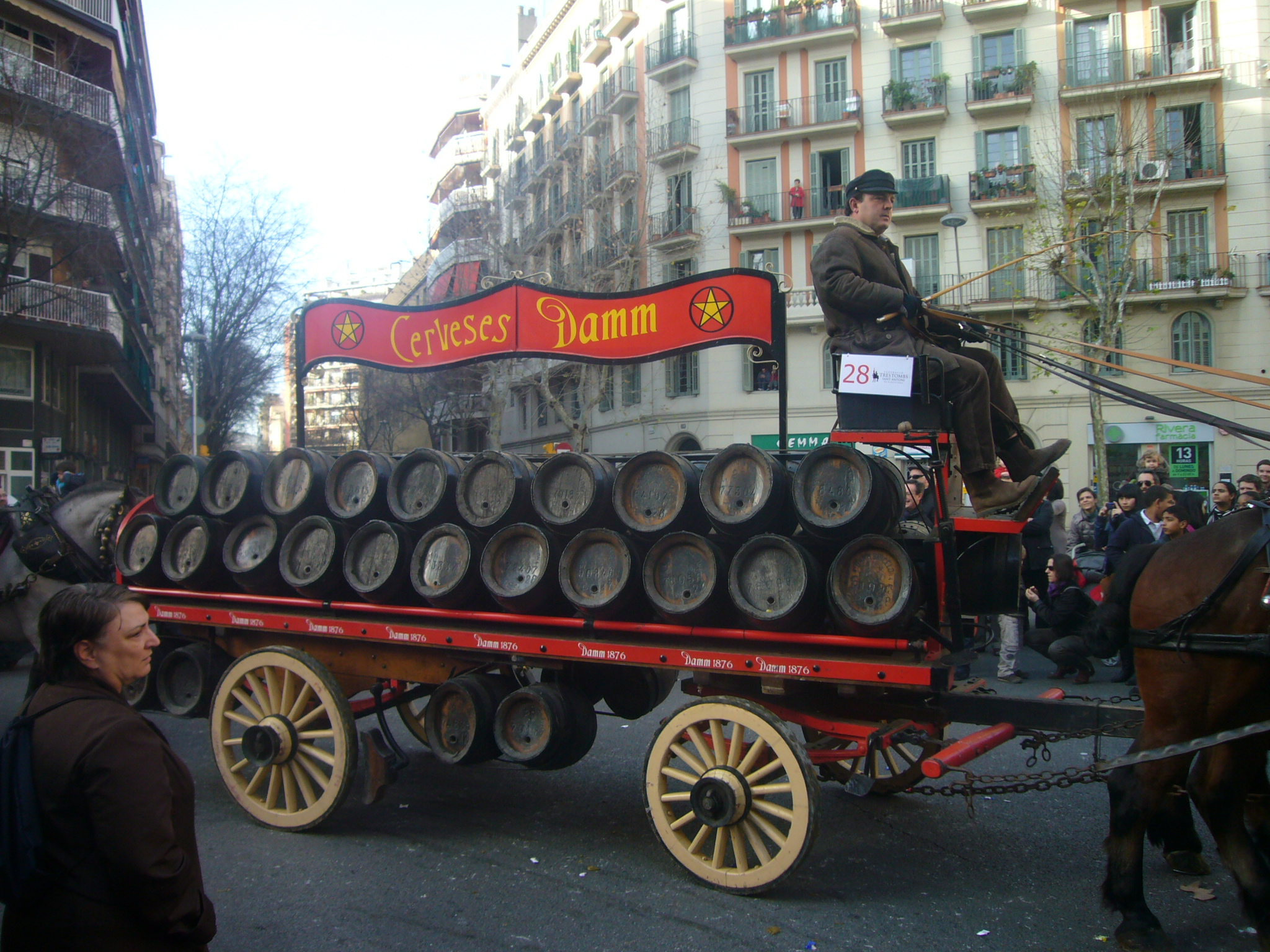
Spain 2012

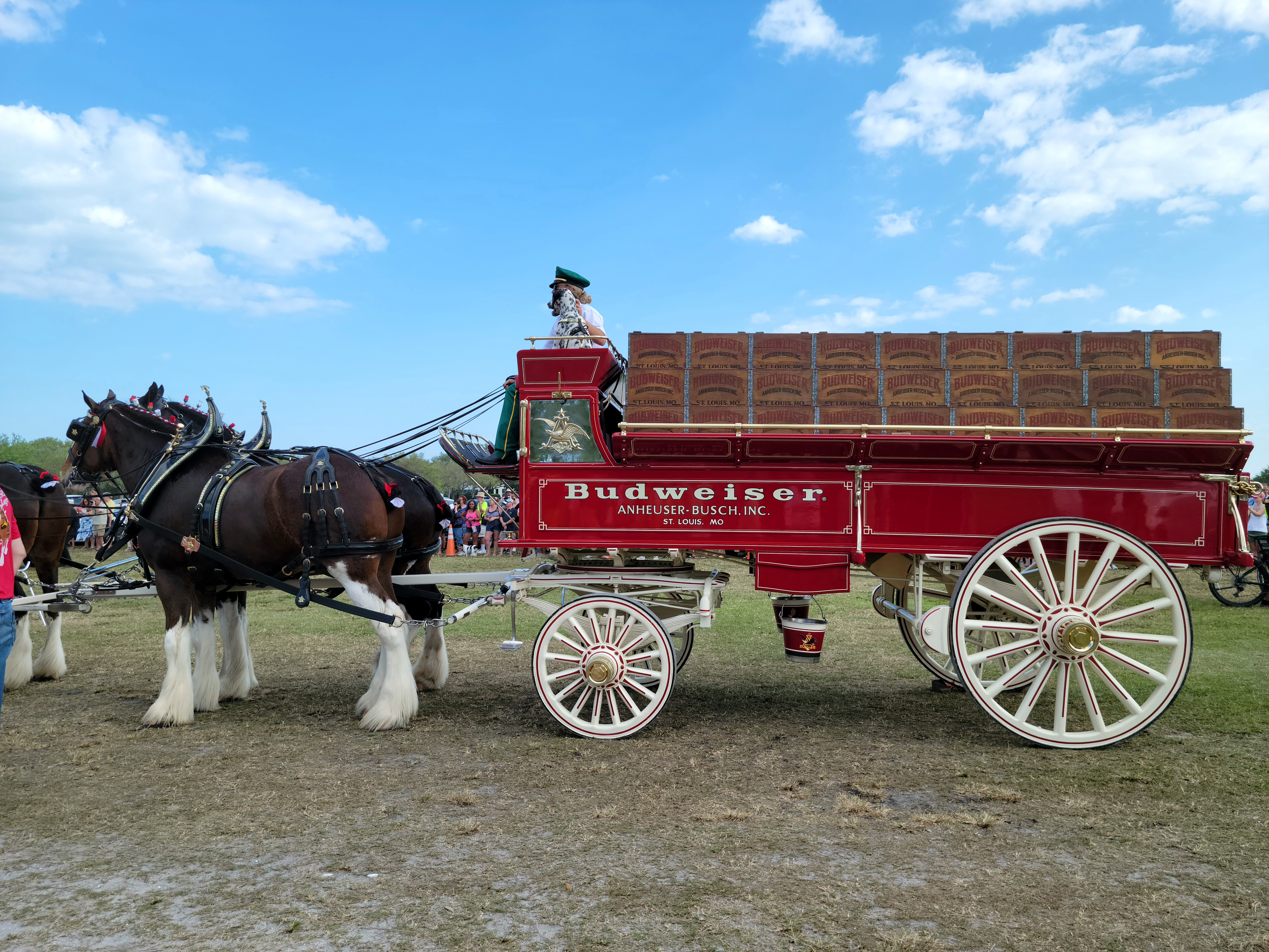
American show wagon 2023

== Vans and delivery wagons ==
A van is a general term for large boxlike wagons, high-sided, usually with a top, and used for deliveries. Doors are usually in the rear and occasionally in the side, and the driving seat is mounted low. One type is the Pantechnicon van, a heavy furniture moving van with a low floor and ramps, originally used by London company The Pantechnicon.

A delivery wagon was used to deliver merchandise such as milk, bread, produce, meat and ice to residential and commercial customers, predominantly in urban settings. The concept of express wagons and paneled delivery vans developed in the 19th century. By the end of the 19th century, delivery wagons were often finely painted, lettered and varnished, serving as image-builders and rolling advertisements. Special forms of delivery wagons include an ice wagon and a milk wagon.

Tank wagons carried liquid cargo. Water wagons made deliveries to areas lacking piped water and for military camp use. In the early 1900s, the American street flusher used a gas-powered pump to clean city streets of litter or mud, and to wet down dust in dry seasons. Liquid manure wagons were low tank vehicles for spreading manure on fields in the 1860s–1900s. Oil wagons operated from the 1880s to 1920s and held up to 500 gallons of oil or spirits.

In the city center of Schwäbisch Gmünd, Germany, since 1992 the city's plants have been irrigated using a horse-drawn wagon with a water tank.

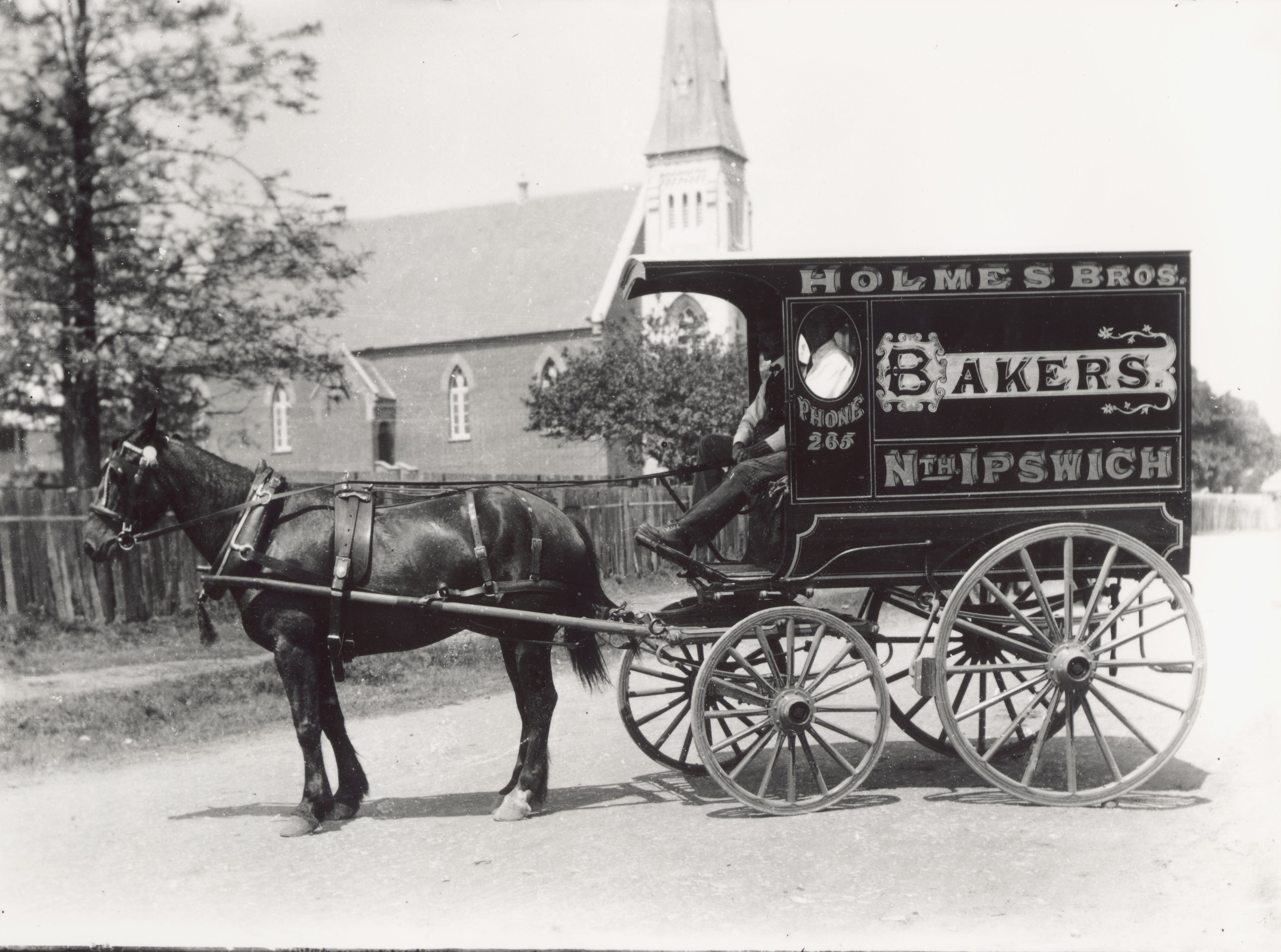
Bakery delivery wagon, Australia 1900s

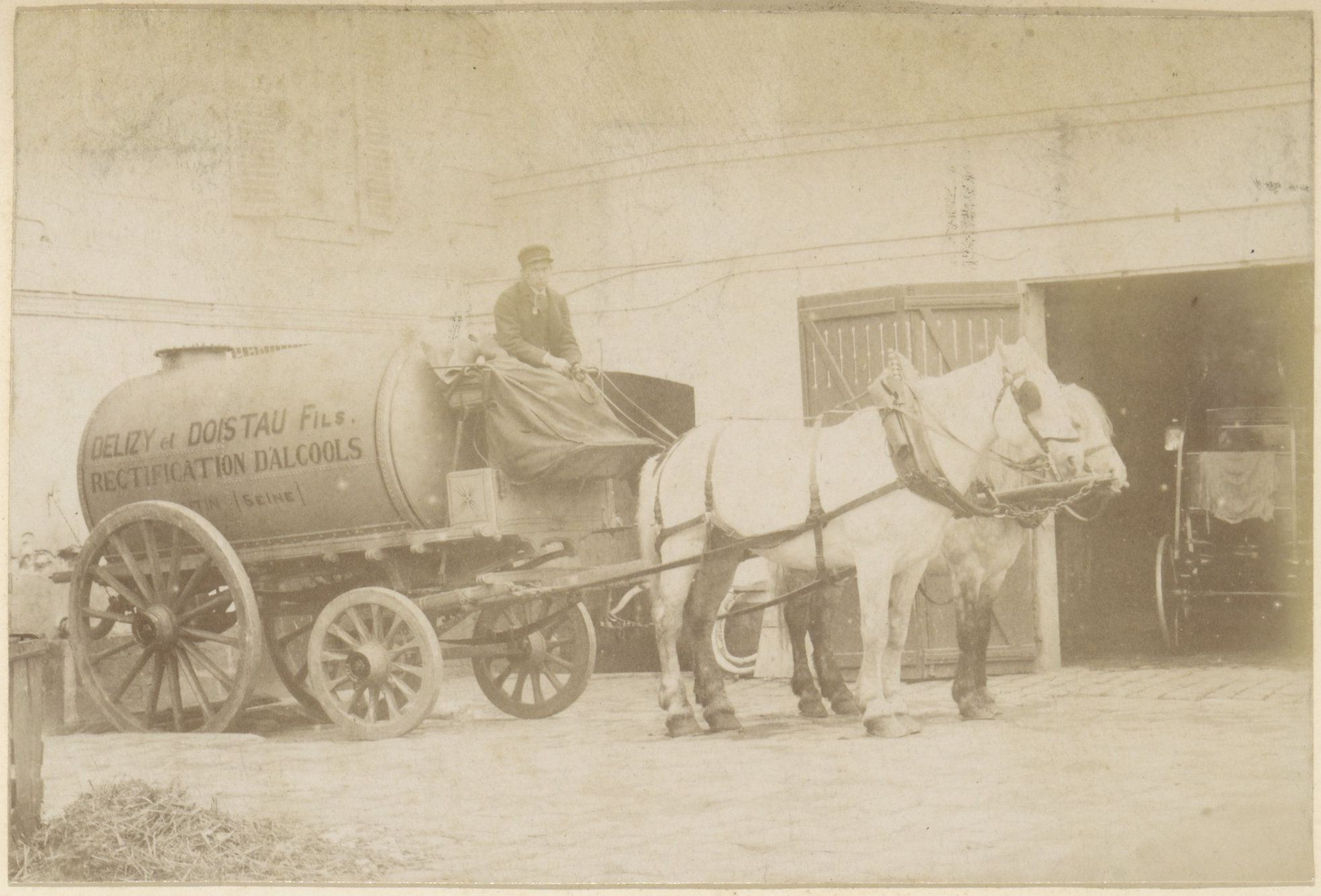
Alcohol tank wagon, France 1900s

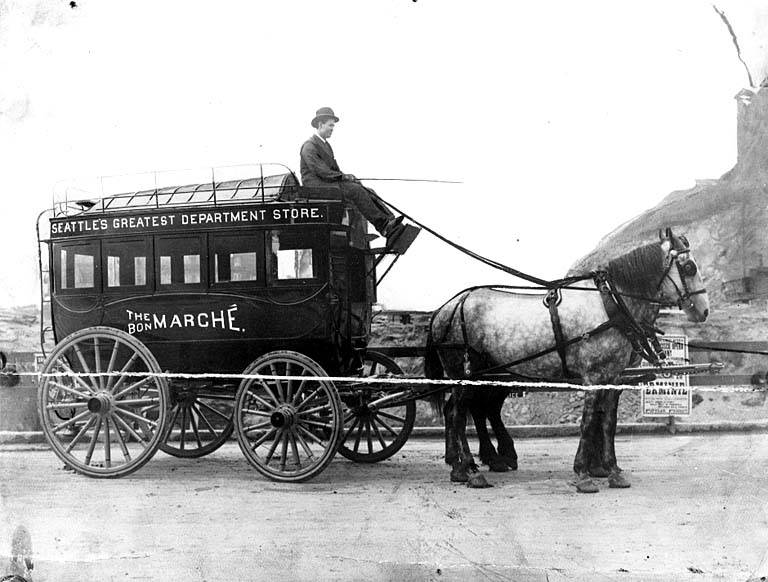
Store delivery, USA 1900s

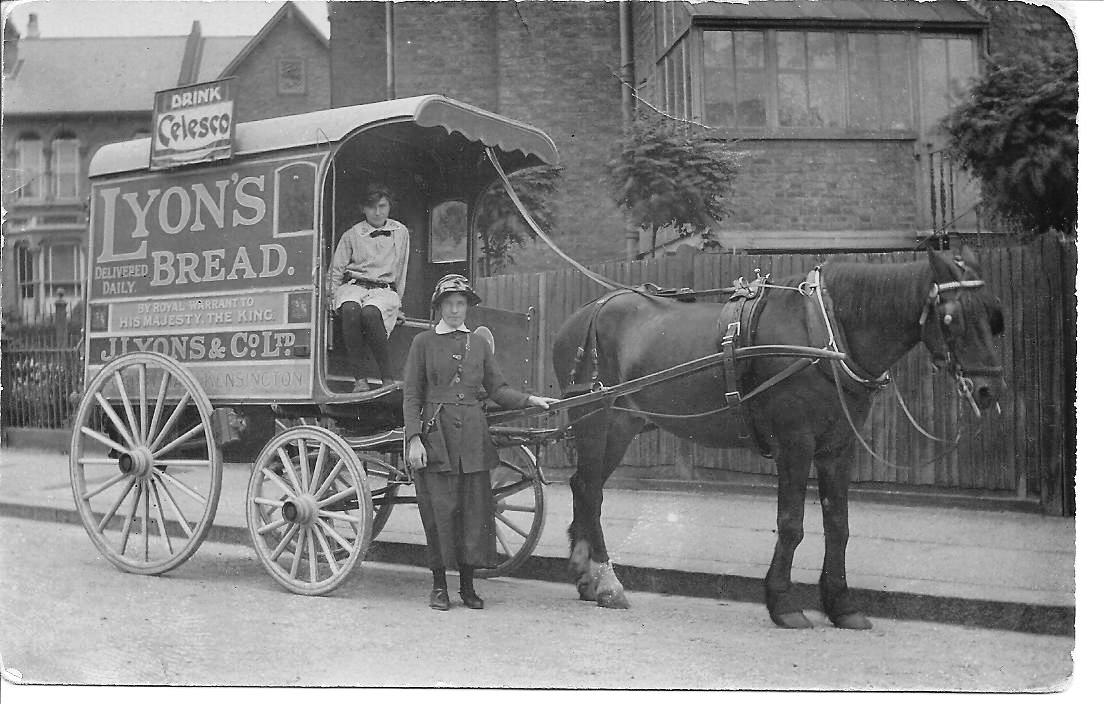
Bread delivery, England 1910s

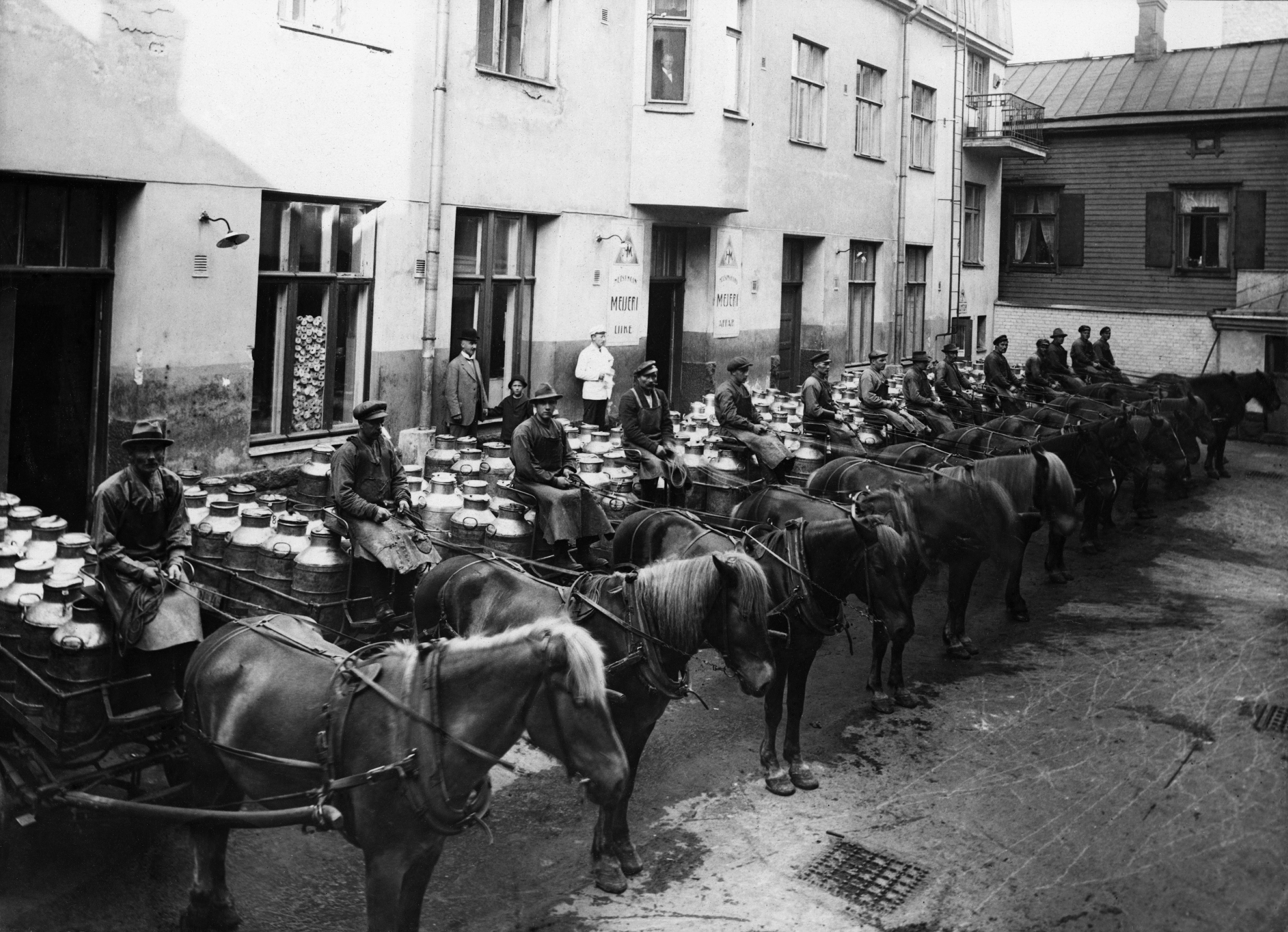
Milk wagons, Finland 1920s

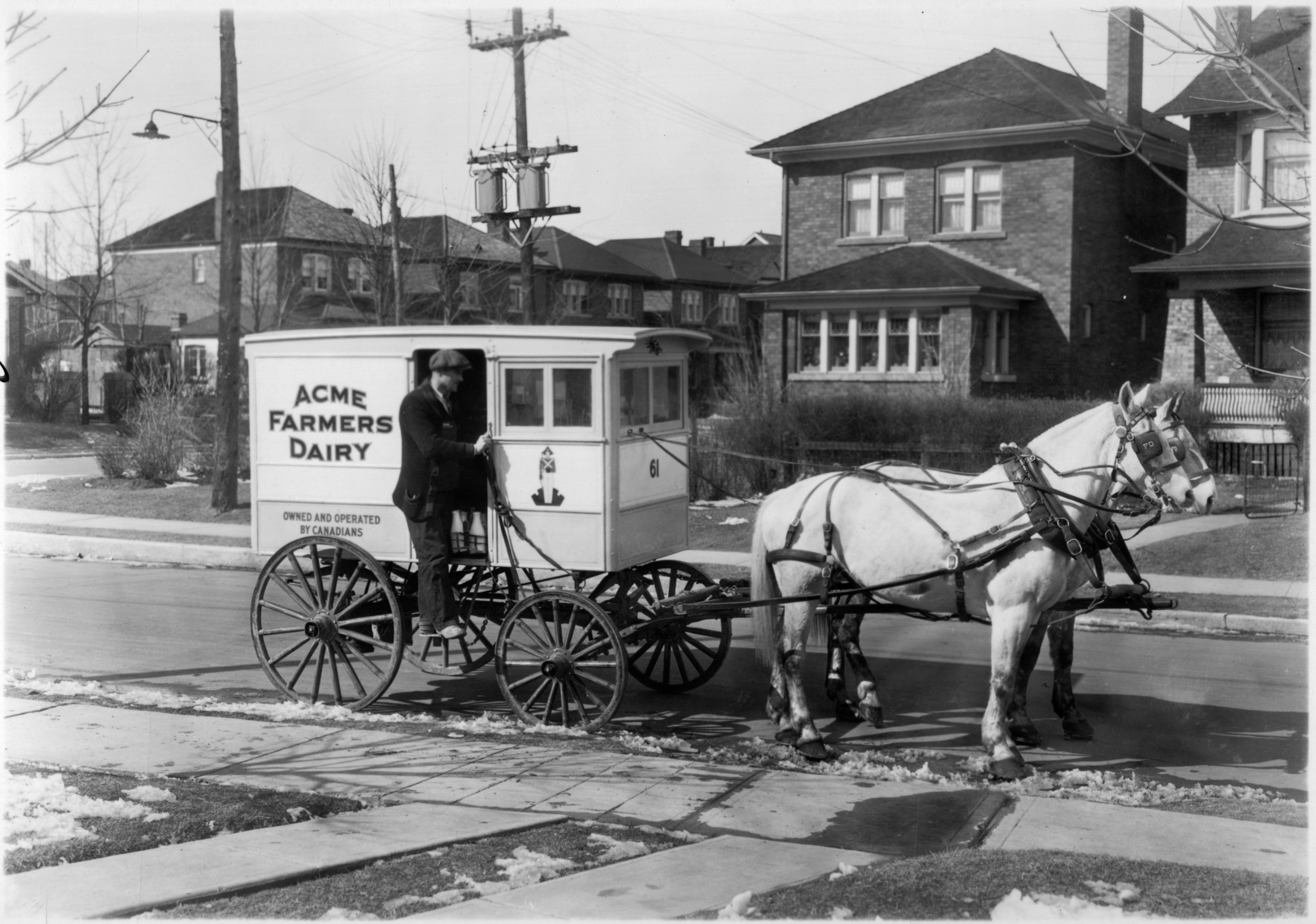
Milk delivery, Canada 1920s

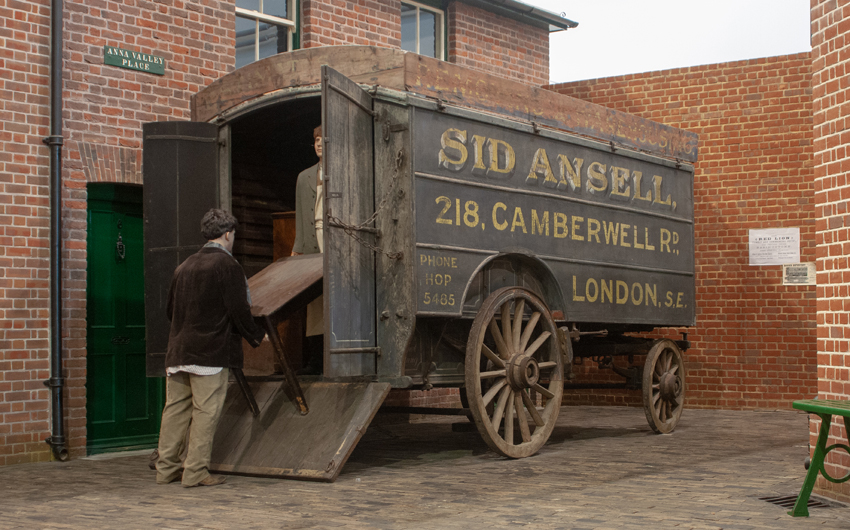
Pantechnicon furniture van

== Camp wagons ==
These wagons serve as mobile shelters and camp support.

- Shepherd's hut – for remote shepherds
- Vardo – traditional wagon of the 19th-century British Romani people
- Living van – used to house roving work crews during early steam engine days
- Showman's wagon – elaborate living accommodations for showmen
- Chuckwagon – a small wagon used for providing food and cooking; essentially a portable kitchen
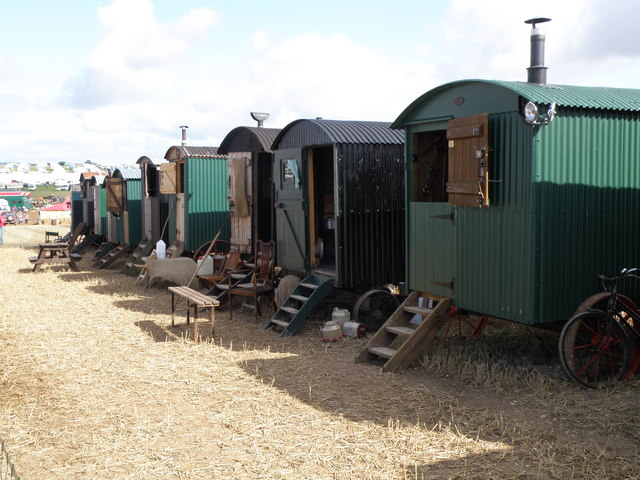
Shepherd huts

A Romani Vardo

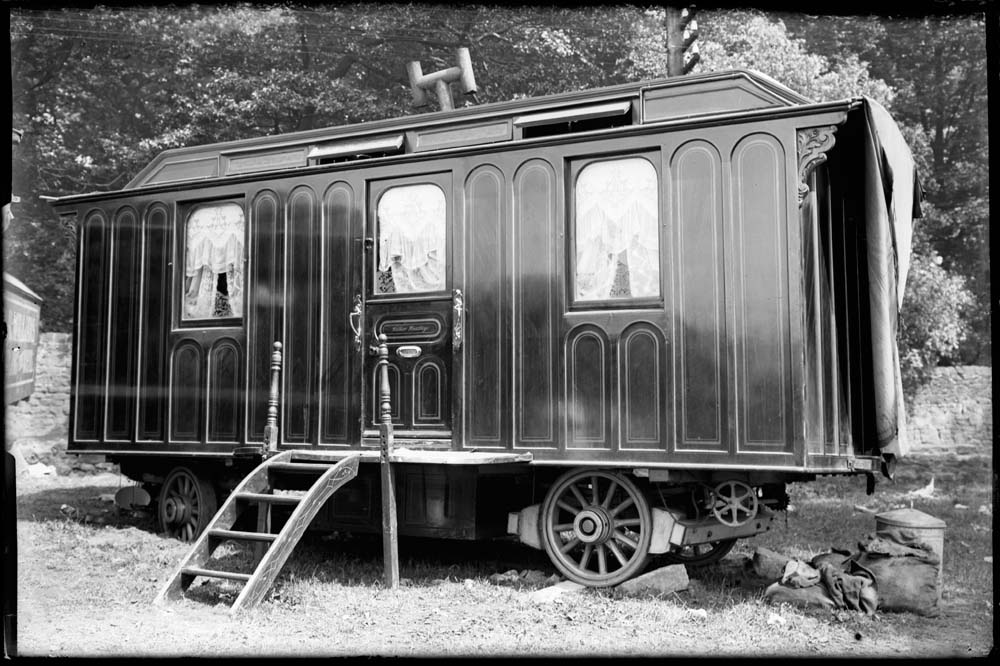
Showman's wagon

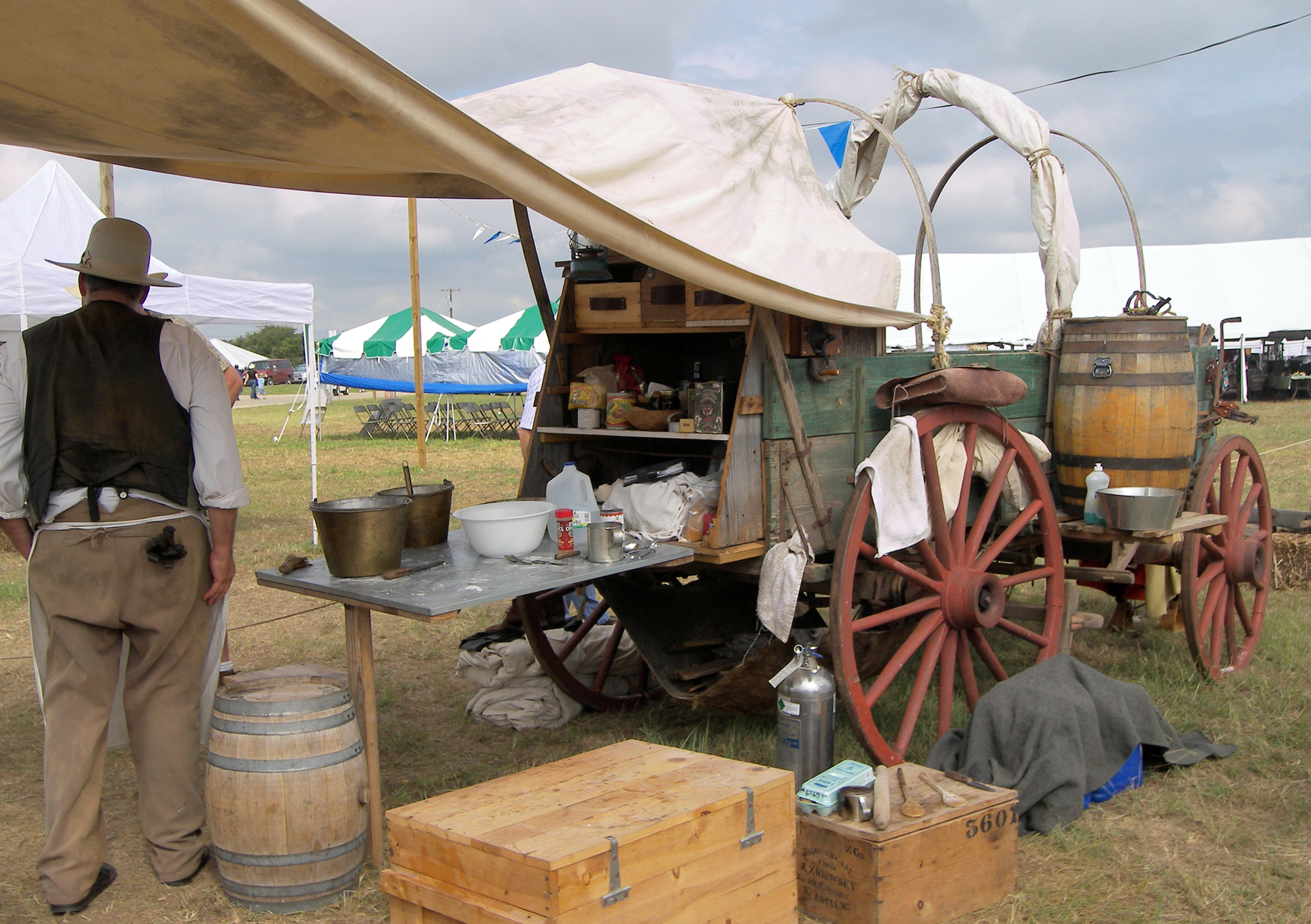
Chuckwagon

== Entertainment and show ==
Traveling circuses decorated their wagons to be able to take part in the grand parade—even packing wagons for equipment, animal cage wagons, living vans and band wagons. Popular in North America was, and still is, the float or show wagon, driven by six horses pulling a highly decorated show wagon with a token payload, and heavily painted with company or owner advertising. Horse-drawn wagons are popular attractions at tourist destinations for leisurely sightseeing.

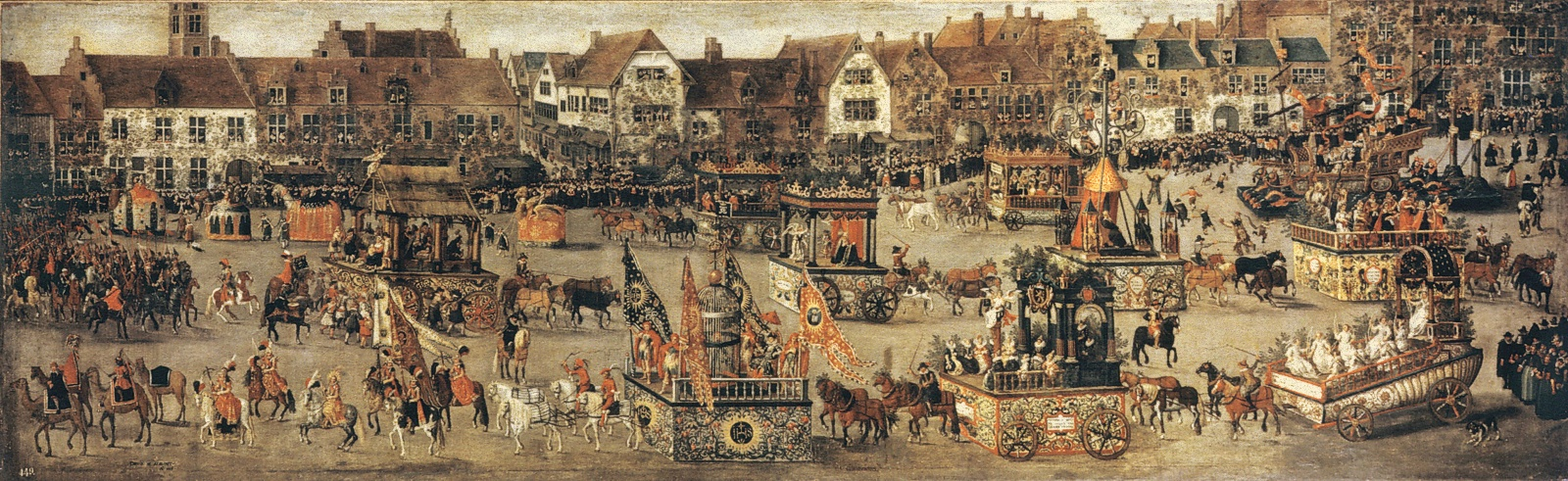
Pageant wagons, Belgium 1615

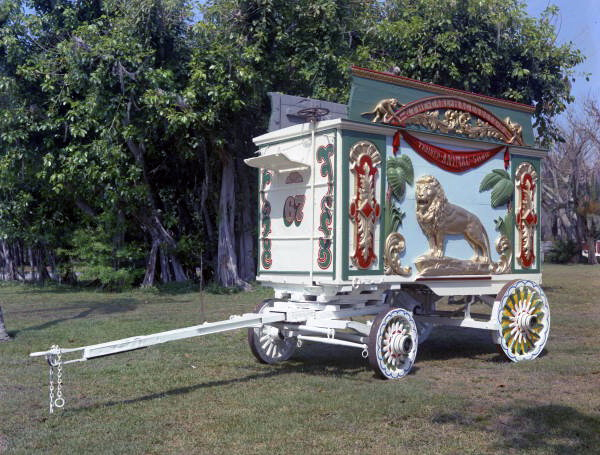
Circus parade wagon, built 1904

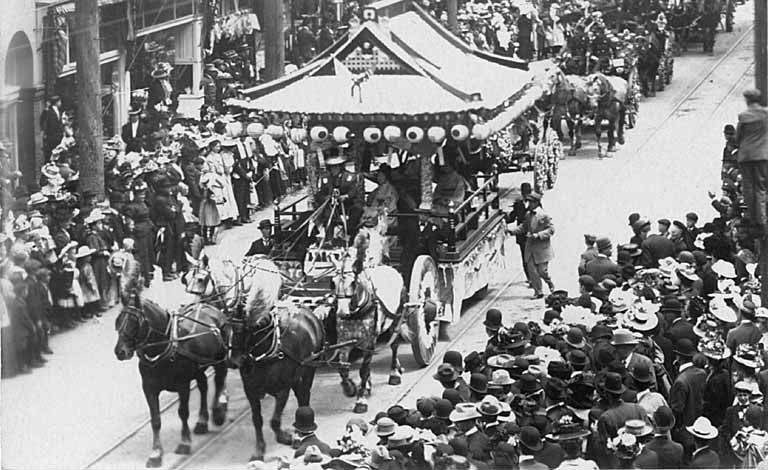
Parade float, USA 1908

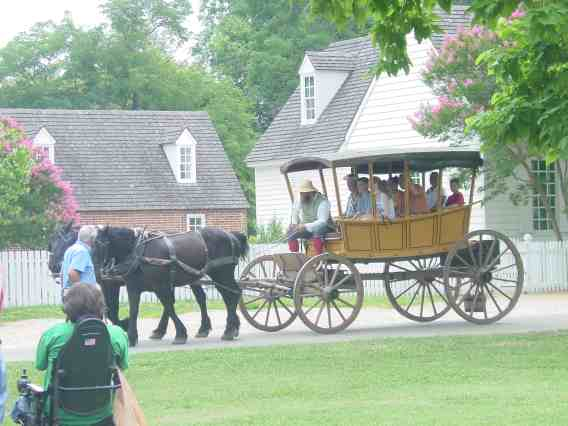
Tourist wagon, USA 2004

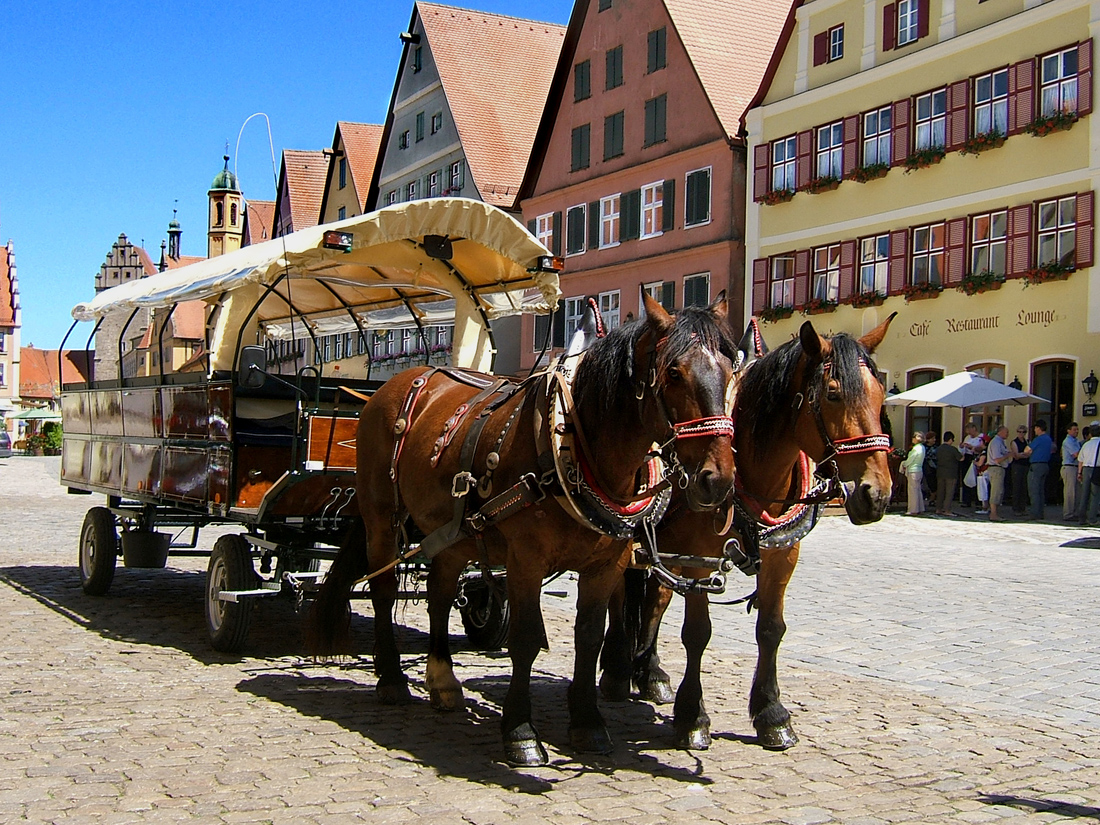
Sight-seeing wagon, Germany 2008

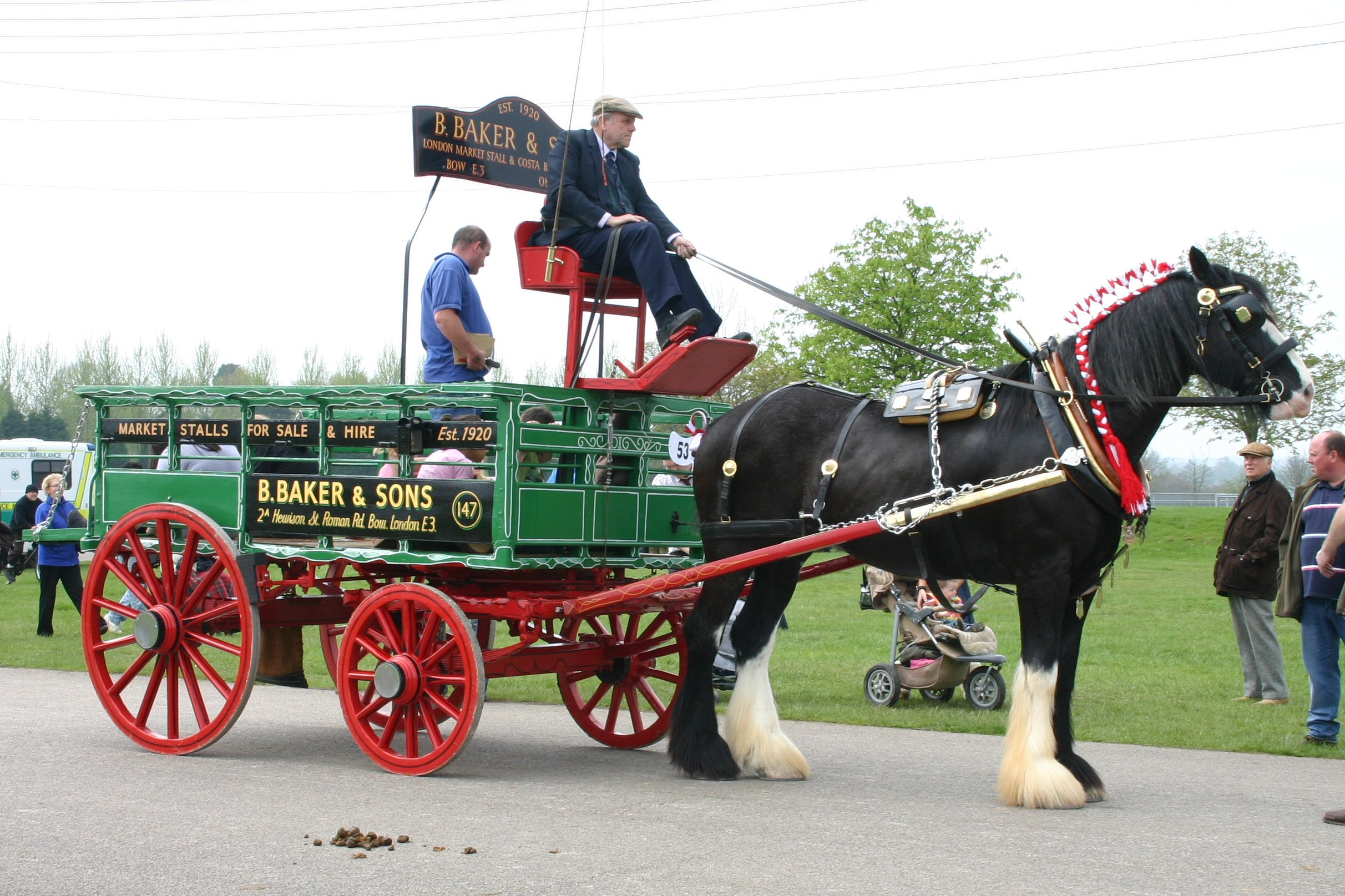
Exhibition wagon, England 2009

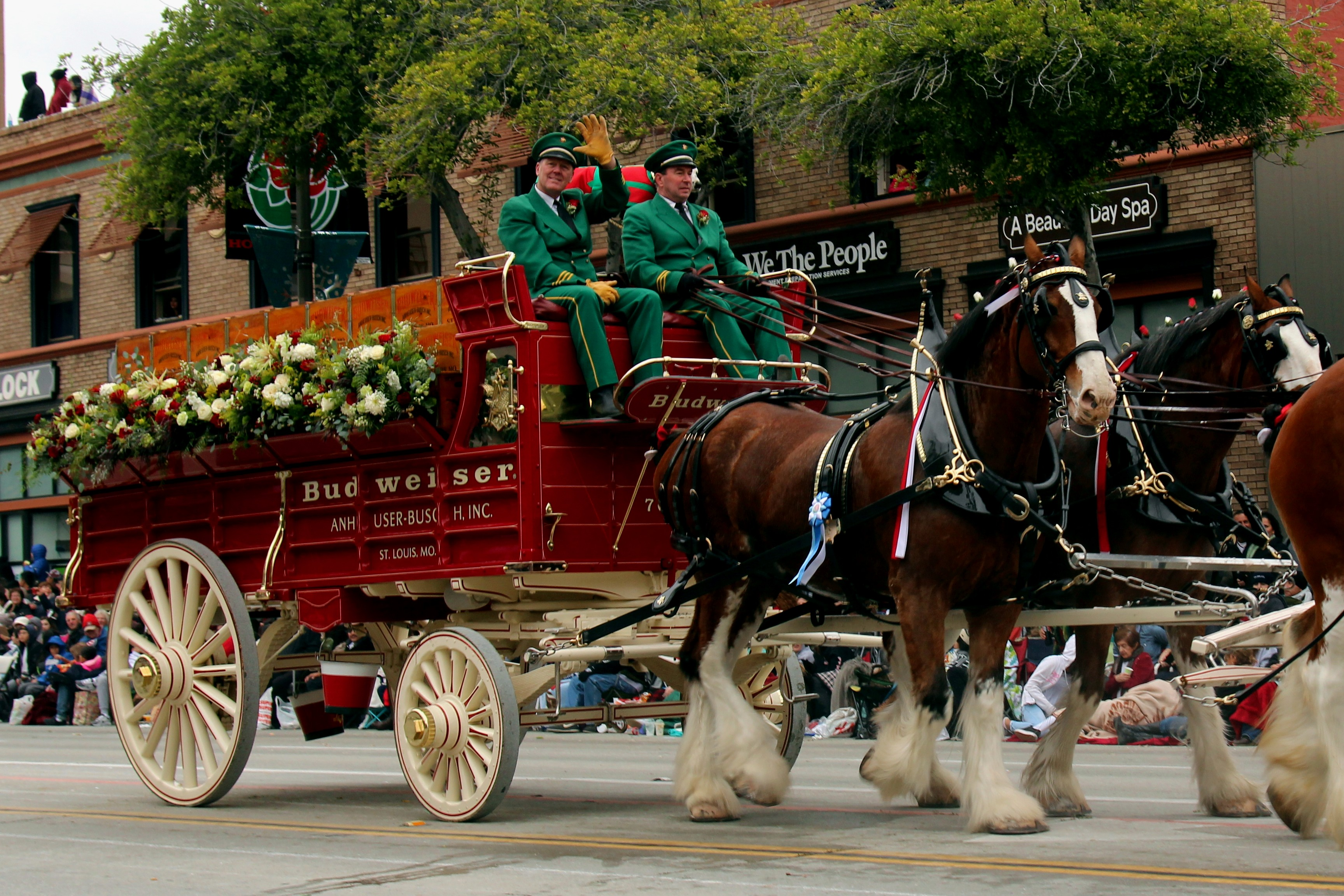
Exhibition wagon, USA 2017

== Motorized wagons ==
During the transition to mechanized vehicles from animal-powered, vehicles were built by coachbuilders and the bodies and undercarriages were substantially similar to the horse-drawn vehicles.

- Duryea Motor Wagon – 1890s gasoline powered, patterned from the American buggy
- Auto Wagon – early 1900s gas-powered, patterned from the American buggy
- High wheeler – 1910s – often made from converted horse-drawn wagons

In modern times, the term station wagon survives as a type of automobile. It describes a car with a passenger compartment that extends to the back of the vehicle, that has no trunk, that has one or more rear seats that can be folded making space for carrying cargo, as well as featuring an opening tailgate or liftgate.

Motorized wagons

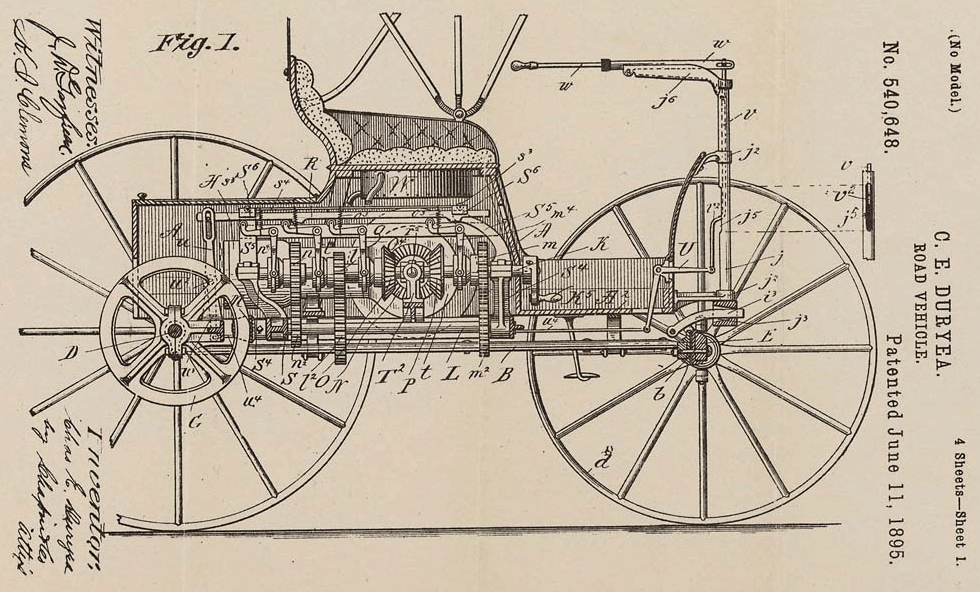
Drawing for the Duryea Road Vehicle, 1895

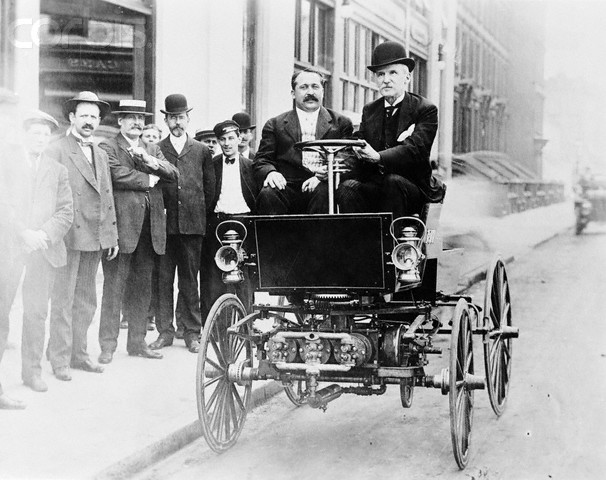
George B. Selden driving an automobile in 1905

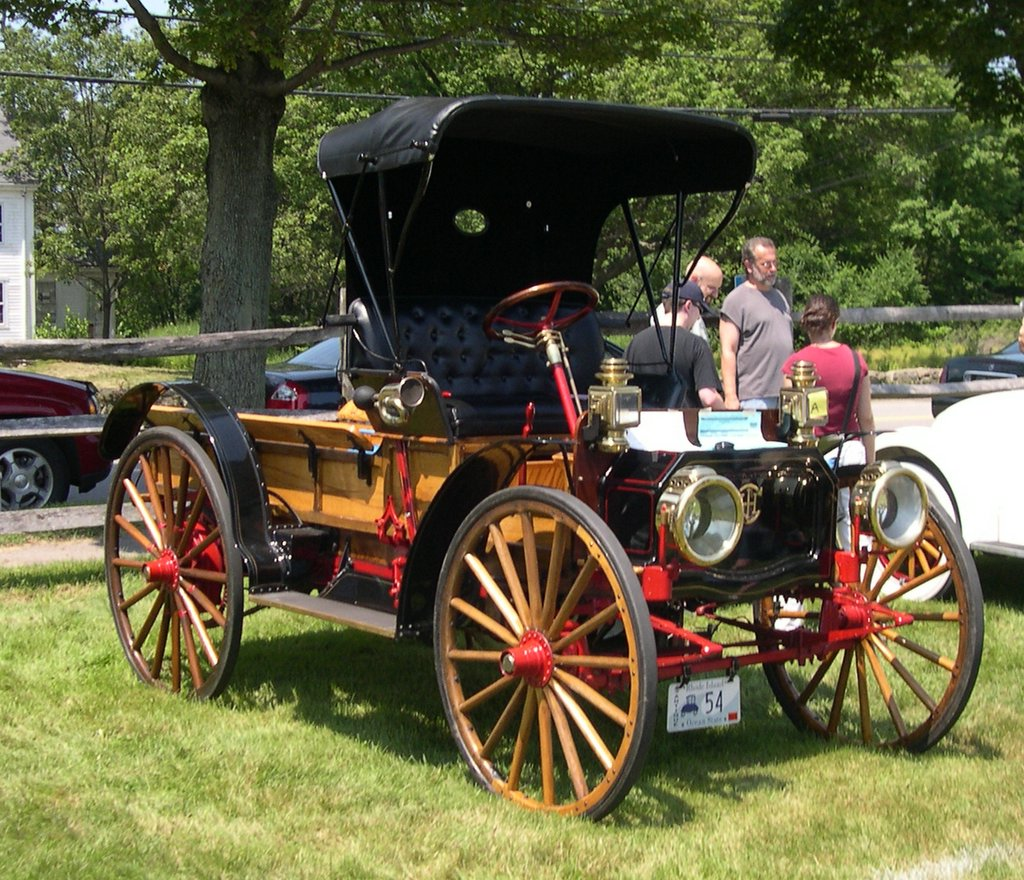
1911 International Harvester Auto Wagon (High wheeler)

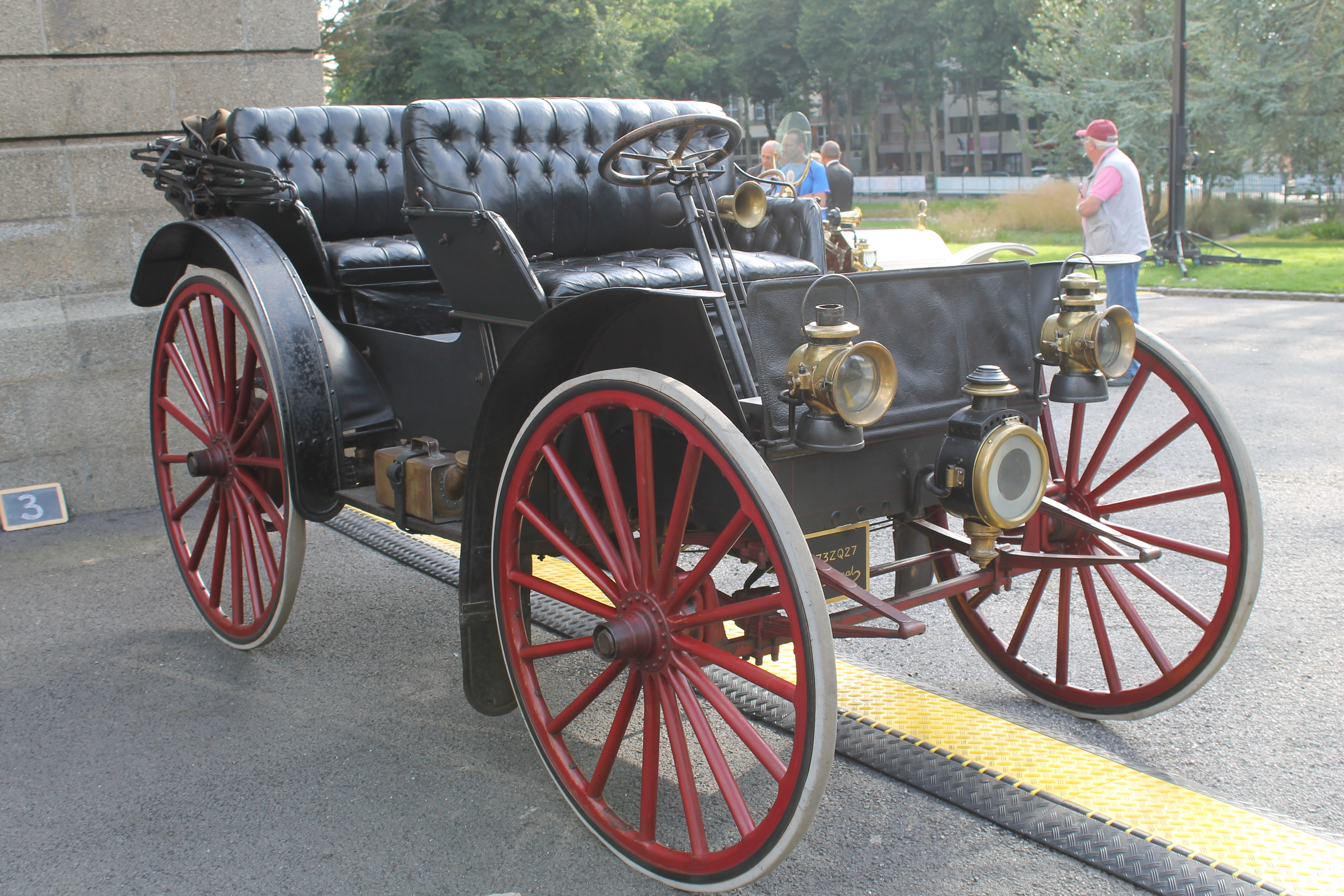
International Harvester Auto-Buggy

== Wagon train ==
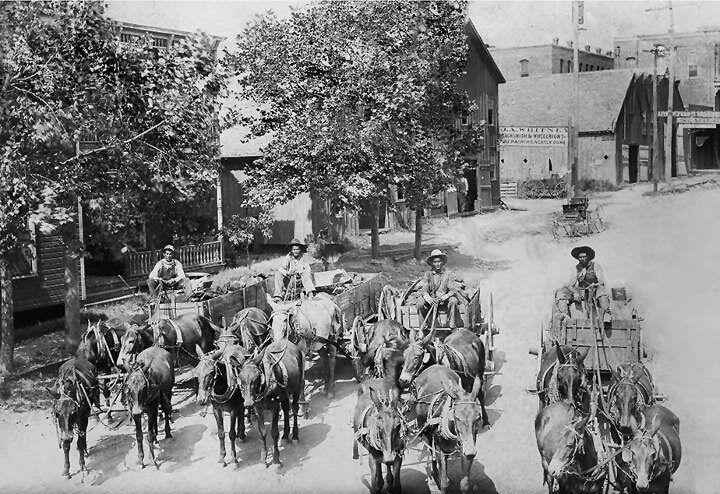
Downtown Hico, Texas Wagon Team. circa 1910

In migration and military settings, wagons were often found in large groups called wagon trains.

In warfare, large groups of supply wagons were used to support traveling armies with food and munitions, forming "baggage trains". During the American Civil War, these wagon trains would often be accompanied by the wagons of private merchants, known as sutlers, who sold goods to soldiers, as well as the wagons of photographers and news reporters. Special purpose-built support wagons existed for blacksmithing, telegraphy and even observation ballooning.

In migration settings, such as the emigrant trails of the American West and the Great Trek of South Africa, wagons would travel together for support, navigation and protection. A group of wagons may be used to create an improvised fort called a laager, made by circling them to form an enclosure. In these settings, a chuckwagon is a small wagon used for providing food and cooking, essentially a portable kitchen.

== Draft animals ==
In addition to horses and oxen, animals such as mules and goats have been used as draft animals for appropriately sized wagons.

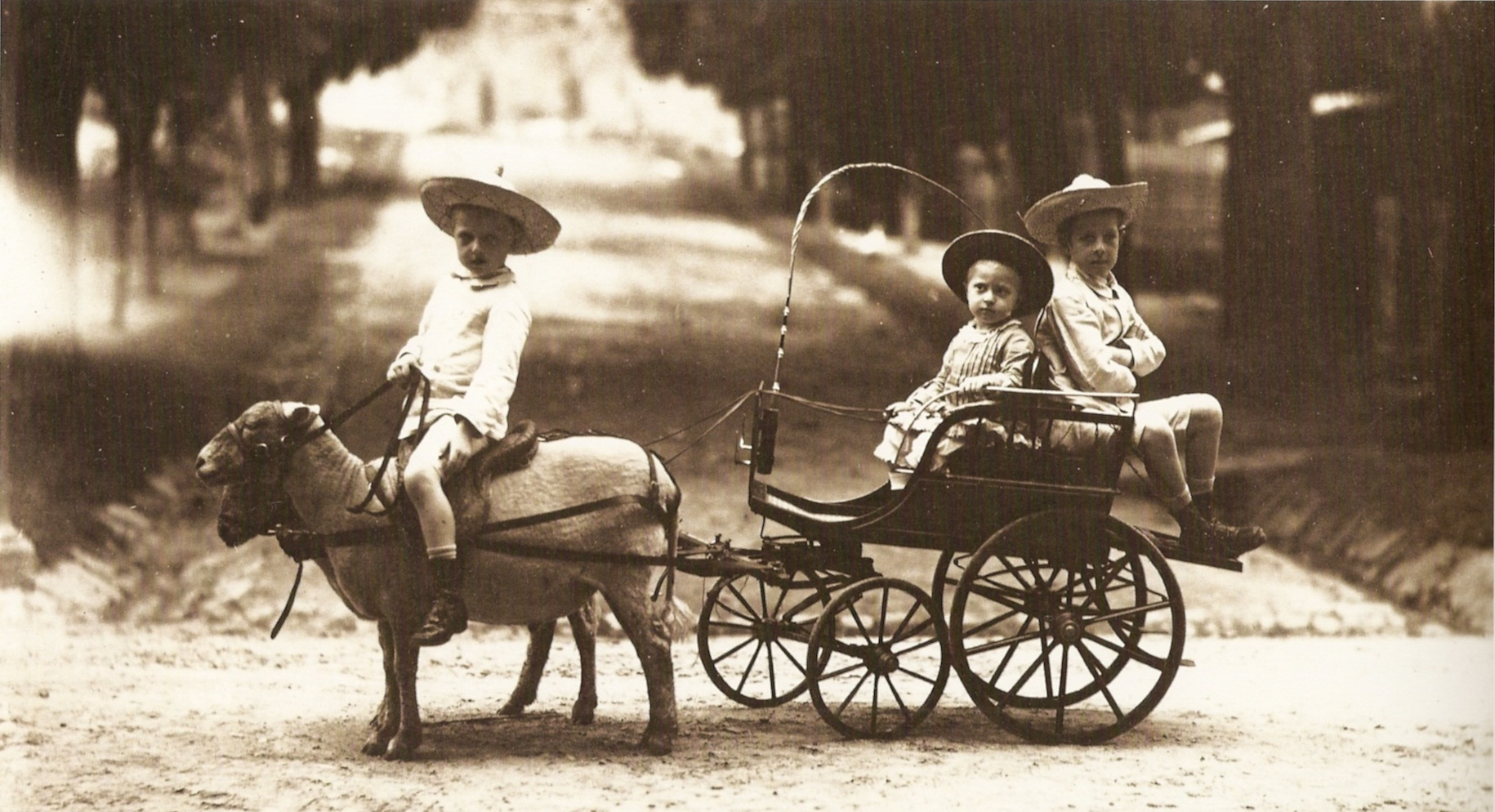
Sheep and children's wagon (1883)

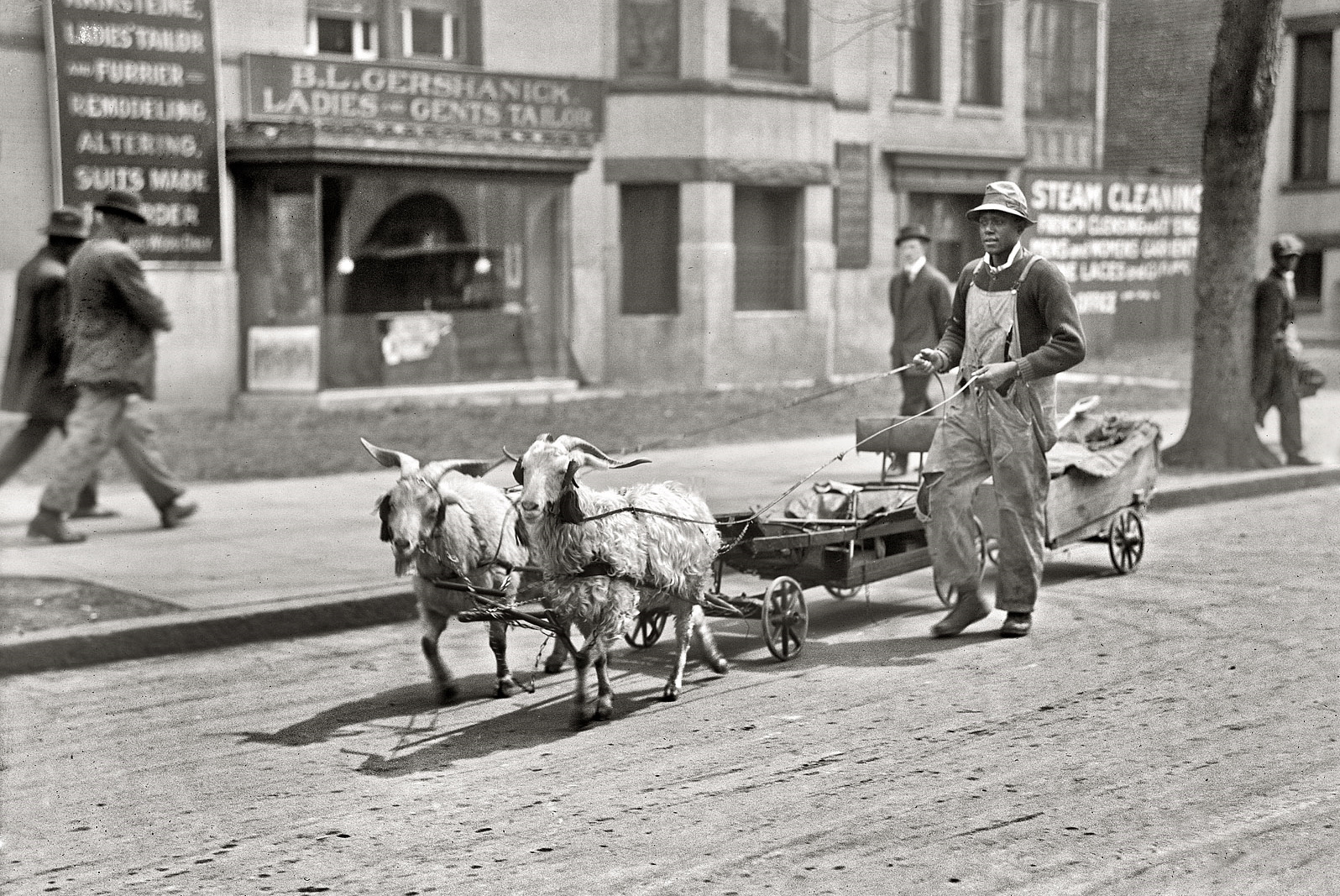
Goat pair and wagon (1917)

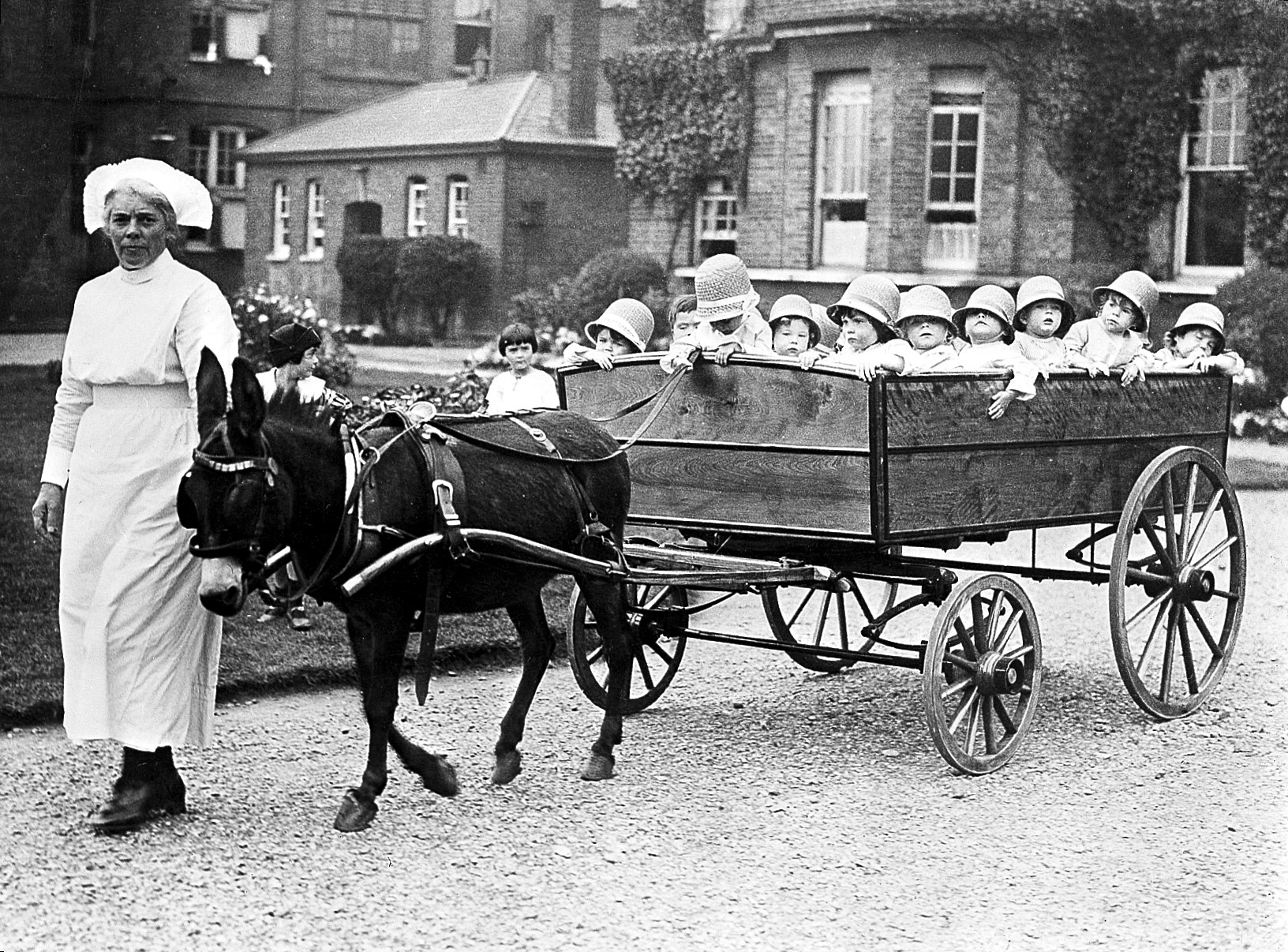
Donkey and wagon full of children (1925)

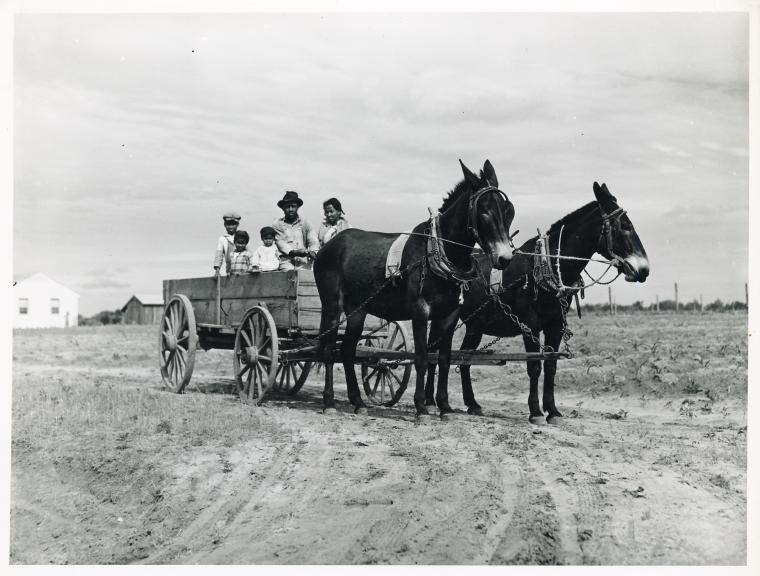
Mule team and wagon (1939)

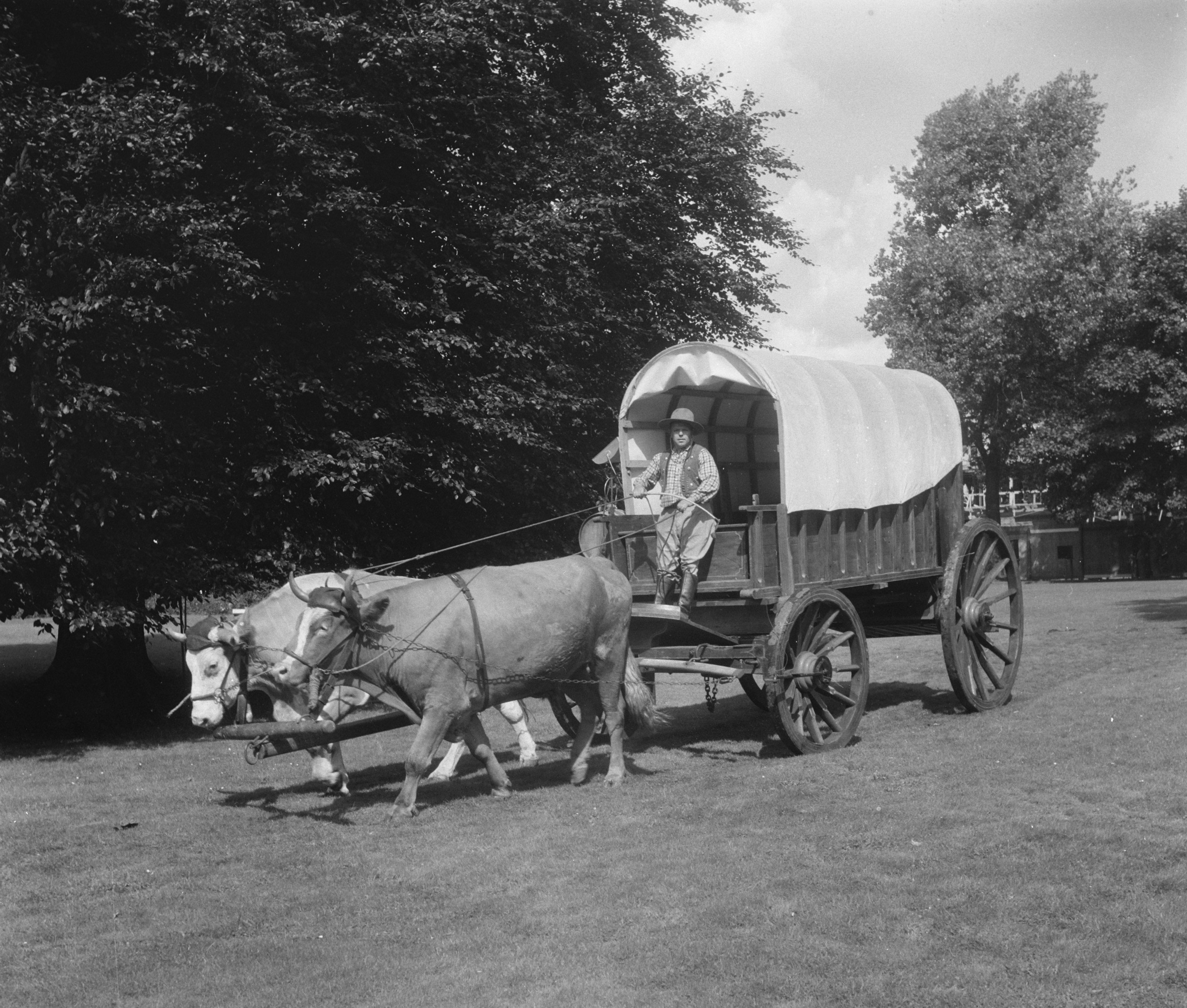
Oxen and covered wagon (1951)

== Wagons in art ==
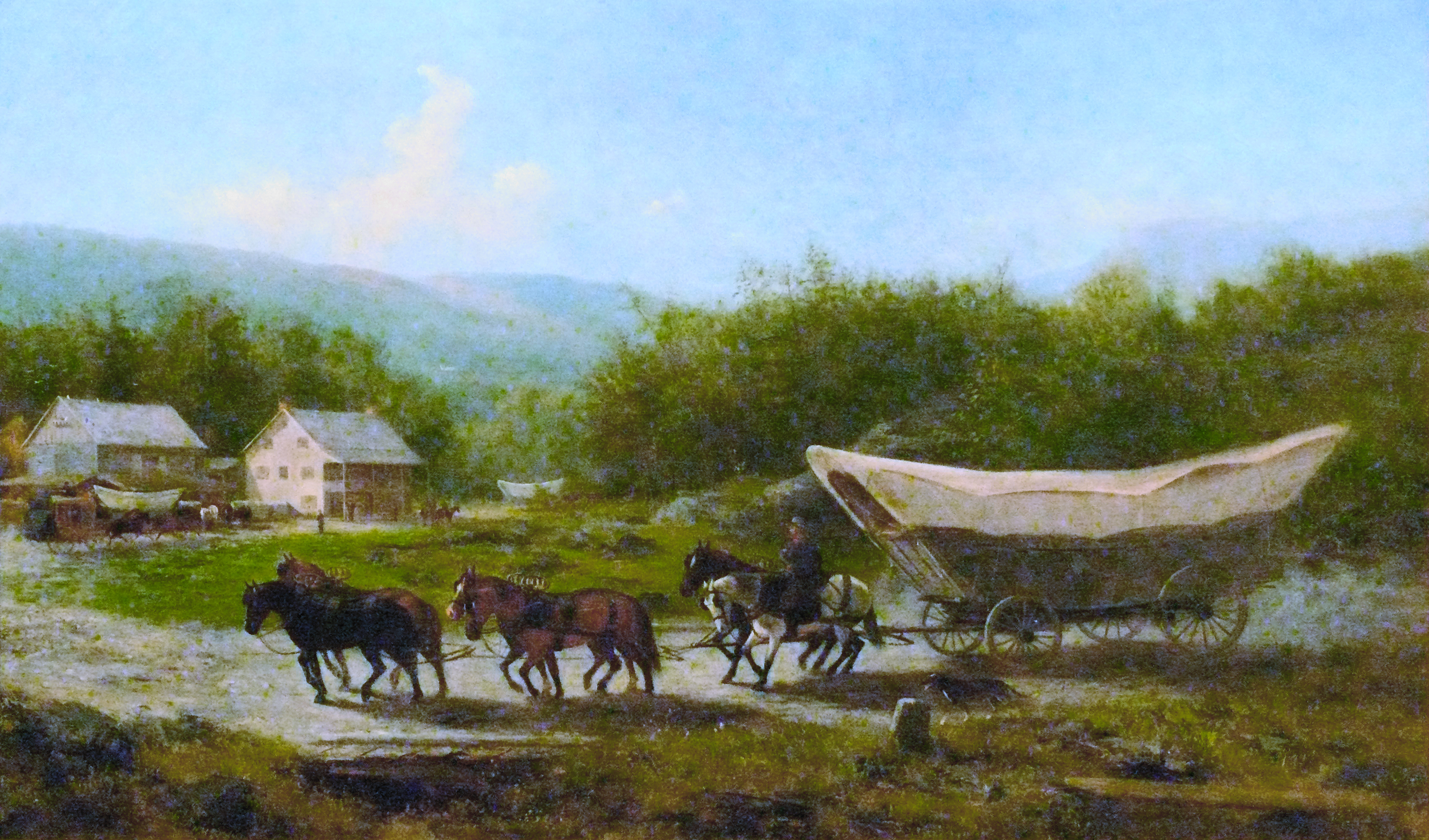
Painting: Conestoga Wagon, 1883

As a common, important element in history and life, wagons have been the subjects of artwork. Some examples are the paintings The Hay Wain and The Haywain Triptych, and on the Oregon Trail Memorial half dollar.

== See also ==
- Horse-drawn vehicle
  - Horsecart
  - Carriage
  - Coach (carriage)
  - Wagonette
- Horse harness
- Wagon wheel
