= Upright (disambiguation) =

Upright is a body-relative direction.

Upright may also refer to:

- Upright (TV series), Australian drama
- Upright Technologies, produces devices for improving posture
- Uprights, the vertical posts of the goal structure used in various sports
- Upright or steering knuckle, an automotive suspension and steering part
- Upright Piano, a type of piano smaller and more compact than a grand piano
- Upright Bass, another name for the double bass to distinguish it from the bass guitar
