= Stub axle =

Axle stub on an 1899 Panhard-Levassor

Bastiaen cargo bike with steering knuckle

A stub axle or stud axle is either one of two front axles in a rear-wheel drive vehicle, or one of the two rear axles in a front-wheel drive vehicle. In a rear-wheel drive vehicle, this axle is capable of angular movement about the kingpin for steering the vehicle.

The stub or stud axle is named so because it resembles the shape of a stub or stud, like a truncated end of an axle, short in shape and blunt. There are four general designs:

1. Elliot axle
2. Reversed Elliot axle
3. Lemoine axle
4. Inverted Lemoine axle

Stub axles are essential components in a vehicle’s suspension system, connecting the wheels to the steering and supporting the vehicle’s weight.

== See also ==
- Spindle (automobile), part of the suspension system that carries the hub for the wheel
