= ABENICS =

Three dimensional ball joint gearing system

ABENICS (Active Ball Joint Mechanism With Three-DoF Based on Spherical Gear Meshings) is a ball joint system which uses a cross-spherical gear in conjunction with a monopole gear in order to be able to manipulate the spherical gear in three dimensions of freedom (pitch, roll, and yaw). Adding a second monopole gear makes the system more robust and capable of highly accurate movement with high torque.

The spherical gear is essentially a pair of 2D gears which have been rotated around their axes, resulting in something resembling a golf ball.

Potential uses include any situation requiring accurate, powerful control over three degrees of freedom, such as in replication human joints.

The design was published in IEEE Transactions on Robotics in October 2021.

The mechanism has been replicated using 3D printing by enthusiasts.
