= Ball joint =

Spherical bearing most commonly used in automobile steering mechanisms

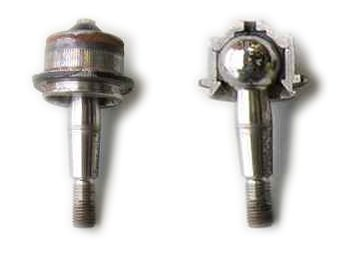
A typical ball joint with cutaway view (right)

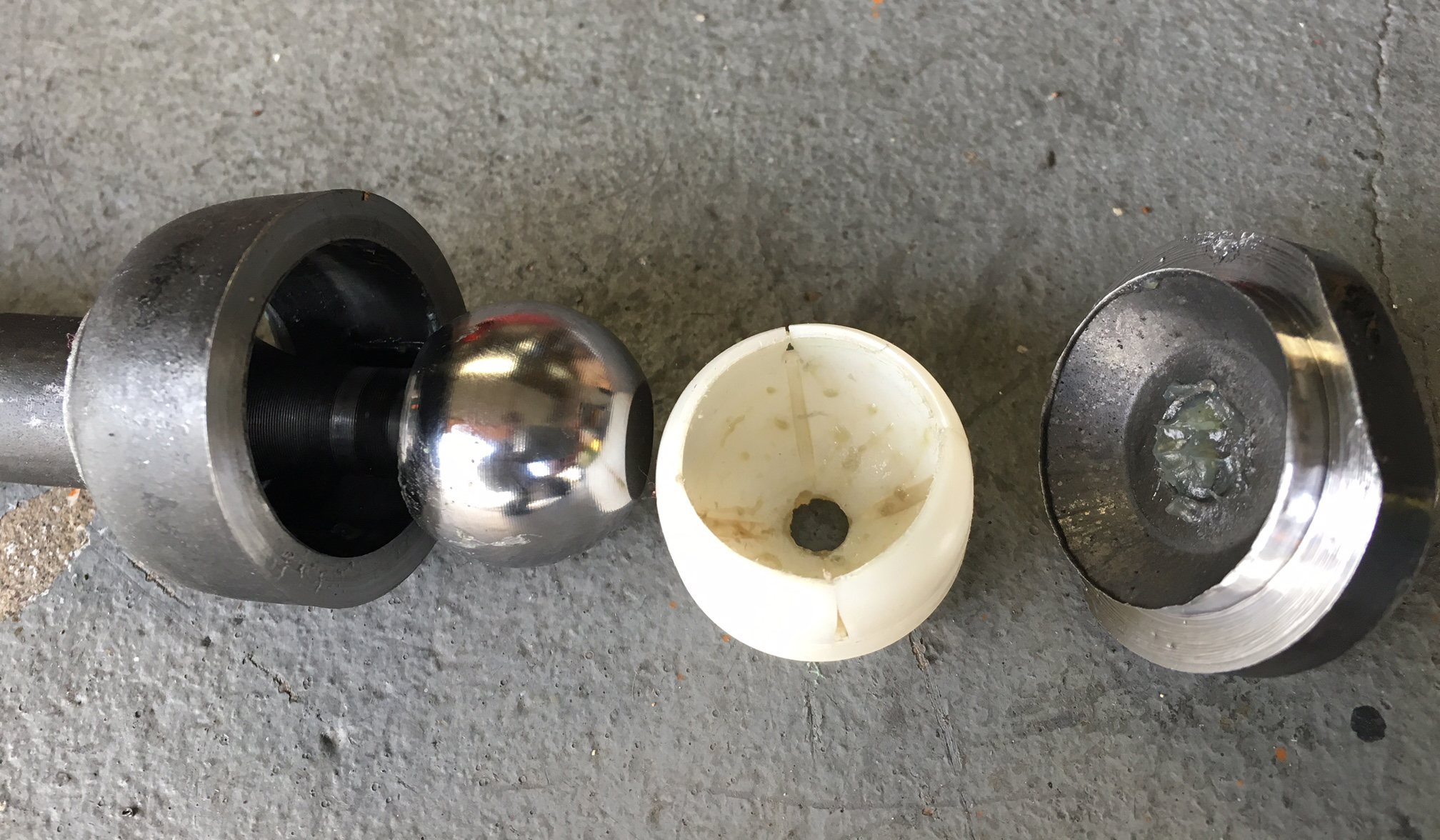
An inner tie rod end cut open to expose the ball joint.

In an automobile, ball joints are spherical bearings that connect the control arms to the steering knuckles, and are used on virtually every automobile made. They bionically resemble the ball-and-socket joints found in most tetrapod animals.

A ball joint consists of a bearing stud and socket enclosed in a casing; all these parts are made of steel. The bearing stud is tapered and threaded, and fits into a tapered hole in the steering knuckle. A protective encasing prevents dirt from getting into the joint assembly. Usually, this is a rubber-like boot that allows movement and expansion of lubricant. Motion-control ball joints tend to be retained with an internal spring, which helps to prevent vibration problems in the linkage.

The "offset" ball joint provides means of movement in systems where thermal expansion and contraction, shock, seismic motion, and torsional motions, and forces are present.

== Theory ==
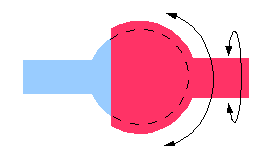
Ball joints allow a limited range of smooth movement in all directions

Ball Joint Animation

A ball joint is used for allowing free rotation in two planes at the same time while preventing translation in any direction, including rotating in those planes. Combining two such joints with control arms enables motion in all three planes, allowing the front end of an automobile to be steered and a spring and shock (damper) suspension to make the ride comfortable.

A simple kingpin suspension requires that the upper and lower control arms (wishbones) have pivot axes that are parallel, and in strict geometric relationship to the kingpin, or the top and bottom trunnions, which connect the kingpin to the control arms, would be severely stressed and the bearings would suffer severe wear. In practice, many vehicles had elastomeric bearings in the horizontal pivots of the trunnions, which allowed some small amount of flexibility, however this was insufficient to allow much adjustment of caster to be made, and also introduced compliance where the suspension designer may not have desired it in his quest for optimum handling. Camber angle could generally be adjusted by moving both inner pivots of either the upper or lower control arm inwards or outwards by an exactly equal amount. But compliance of the control arm inner pivots, typically due to the use of elastomeric bearings, would again cause the trunnions to be stressed. The suspension designer's freedom was limited, it was necessary to have some compliance where it might not be wanted, and very little where more would have been useful in absorbing the fore and aft impact loading from bumps.

The introduction of ball joints top and bottom allowed 3-axis articulation and so removed all the constraints on the control arm axes being exactly parallel, so caster could be freely adjusted, typically by asymmetric adjustment of the position of the control arm inner pivots, while camber was adjusted by the symmetric adjustment of these same pivots.

The arrangements for adjusting the toe angle are not changed by introducing ball joints in the suspension, although the steering linkage itself must use 4 or more pivots, also usually ball joints, and in almost every vehicle ever made, some of these have been adjustable by having a threaded end and locknut, to enable the toe to be set precisely.

This ability to fine-tune ball-jointed suspension allows manufacturers to make the automobile more stable and easier to steer, compared to the older kingpin style suspension. It may also be quieter and more comfortable, because lateral and fore and aft compliance in the suspension can be introduced in controlled amounts at the control arm inner pivots without compromising the integrity of the steering axis pivots, which are now ball joints instead of a king pin and trunnions. The smoother ride may also increase tire tread life, since the ball-joint suspension allows better control of suspension geometry and so can provide better tire-to-road contact.

== Purpose ==
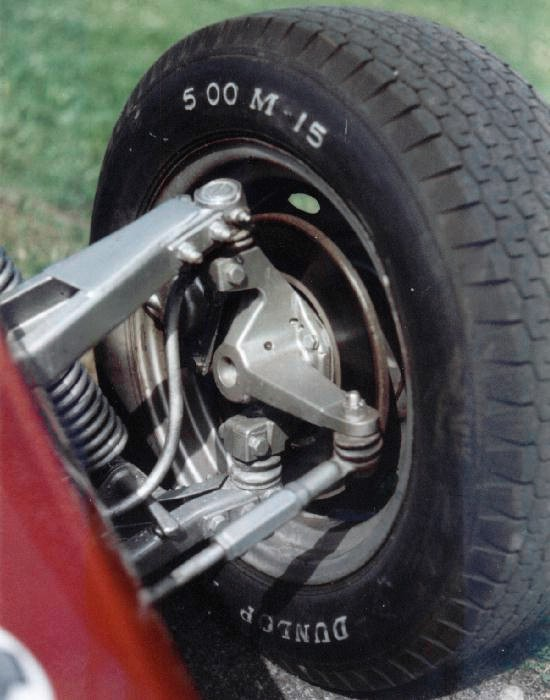
Rear wheel drive vehicle, front double wishbone suspension with upper and lower ball joints and tie rod end shown.

On modern vehicles, joints are the pivot between the wheels and the suspension of an automobile. They are today almost universally used in the front suspension, having replaced the kingpin/link pin or kingpin/trunnion arrangement, but can also be found in the rear suspension of a few higher-performance autos. Ball joints play a critical role in the safe operation of an automobile's steering and suspension.

Many currently manufactured automobiles worldwide use MacPherson strut suspension, which utilises one ball joint per side, between the lower end of the strut and the control arm, with the necessary small amount of articulation at the top of the strut being usually provided by an elastomeric bearing, within which is a ball bearing to allow free rotation about the steering axis. So, there are commonly only two ball joints in the suspension, however there will be at least four (track rod ends and rack ends) in the steering linkage.

In non-MacPherson strut automobile suspension, the two ball joints are called the "upper ball joint" and "lower ball joint". Lower ball joints are sometimes larger and may wear out faster, because the fore and aft loads, primarily due to braking, are higher at the bottom ball joint. (Torque reaction and drag add at the bottom joint, and partly cancel at the top joint.) Also, lateral cornering loads are higher at the bottom joint. Depending on the suspension design, the vertical load from the suspension spring may be handled entirely by the top ball joint, or entirely by the bottom ball joint. The damper load, (which is low in normal conditions, zero when stationary, but in peak bump or rebound rate may be almost as large as the spring load) is usually, but not always, taken on the same ball joint as the spring load. The anti-roll bar loading is often, but not always, taken on the bottom ball joint. It may be taken by the top ball joint, or directly from the steering knuckle by ball-jointed drop links.

If one of the ball joints does not carry spring load, it may be fitted with an internal anti-rattle spring to keep the ball preferentially in contact with one seat. This was the case in the BMC Mini of 1959 and its many derivatives, where the lower control arm carried no vertical loading, so the joint needed an anti-rattle spring, while the top joint, comprising identical parts, was always in compression due to spring (rubber cone) and damper loads, and so was not fitted with a spring.

Other vehicles of the 1960s era, including some Vauxhalls, had lower ball joints with considerable end float, because the joint was always in tension as the spring and damper loads were applied via the lower control arm and were always non-zero.

Another example is the Ford Focus, which uses MacPherson struts, and the anti-roll bar is connected directly to the strut, so the lower ball joint is only carrying fore and aft traction/braking and lateral cornering loads.

== Front-wheel drive ==
Unlike a kingpin, which requires an assembly in the center of the wheel in order to pivot, joints connect to the upper and lower end of the spindle (steering knuckle), to the control arms. This leaves the center section open to allow the use of front-wheel drive. Older kingpin designs can only be used in a rear-wheel-drive configuration.

== Lubrication ==
Sealed ball joints do not require lubrication as they are "lubed for life". Formerly most ball joints had grease fitting (sometimes called a grease zerk) and were designed for periodic addition of a lubricant, however almost all modern cars use sealed ball joints to minimise maintenance requirements. The lubricant was usually a very high-viscosity lubricant. It is commonly believed that standard ball joints will outlive sealed ones because eventually the seal will break, causing the joint to dry out and rust. Additionally, the act of adding new lubricant pushes out old and dry lubricant, extending the life of the joint. This was supposed to be done at intervals of 1000 to 2000 miles on many vehicles, which is incompatible with the service interval on modern cars, often 12000 miles or more, and in any case was rarely attended to by owners, resulting in severe wear and possible ball joint failure, which can result in serious accidents. For this reason, almost all ball joints on modern European or Far Eastern cars are the sealed for life type. New technology especially applied to the internal bearing design has allowed ball joints to meet these longer service intervals. The special designs incorporate sintered metal bearings which replace OEM sealed polymer/plastic version and improved dust boot seals that work much better at retaining the grease.

== Spherical rolling joint ==
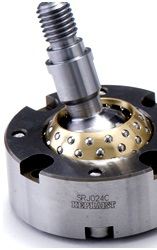
A SRJ024C-P Spherical Rolling Joint

A spherical rolling joint is a high-precision ball joint consisting of a spherical outer and inner race separated by ball bearings. The ball bearings are housed in a spherical retainer and roll along both the inner and outer surfaces. This design allows the joint to have very low friction while maintaining a large range of motion and backlash as low as 1 μm. SRJs are often used in parallel robotics applications like a Stewart platform, where high rigidity and low backlash are essential.

Most SRJs are designed with an offset housing, allowing for higher compressive loads in a smaller space. Alternatively, the joint can be assembled backwards for higher tensile load capability but less range of motion.

An alternative to the SRJ is the universal joint, which consists of two revolute joints. By using spherical rolling joints instead of universal, designers can reduce the number of joints to achieve the same result. Using a spherical joint as opposed to a universal joint also eliminates the problematic possibility of a kinematic singularity. Plain spherical bearings can be used in place of SRJs at the cost of increased friction, but offer an opportunity to preload the joint further.

== Failure ==
While there is no exact lifespan that can be put on sealed ball joints, they can fail as early as 80,000 miles (130,000 km) in modern vehicles, and much sooner in older vehicles. Signs of a failing ball joint may start with a sudden burst sound as a result of ball joint dismantling. Then it keeps on with clicking, popping or snapping sound when the wheel is turned and eventually turn into a squeaking sound at the end of a stop, when the gas pedal is used and/or also when hitting bumps. Another symptom could be 'thud' noises coming from front suspension when going over bumps. Dry ball joints have dramatically increased friction and can cause the steering to stick or be more difficult.

If a ball joint fails, the results can be dangerous as the wheel's angle becomes unconstrained, causing loss of control. Because the tire will be at an unintended angle, the vehicle will come to an abrupt halt, damaging the tires. Also, during failure, debris can damage other parts of the vehicle.

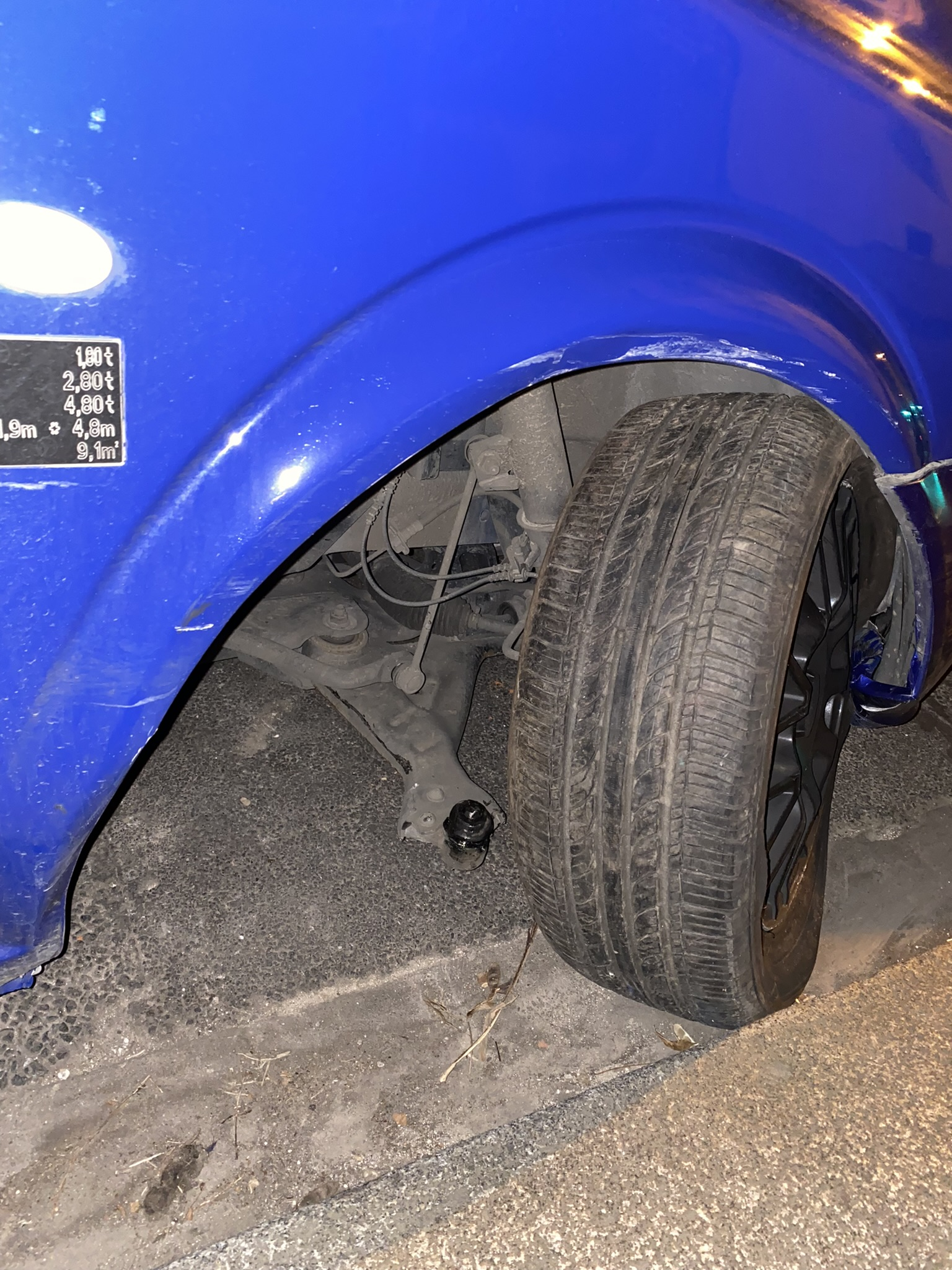
A ball joint failure no longer constrains the wheel's angle, causing the whole strut to sit outside of its intended position.

== Other uses ==
While in automotive parlance the term "ball joint" usually refers to the primary ball joint connections at the ends of the control arms, this type of joint is used in other parts as well, including tie rod ends. In these other applications, they are typically called tie rod ends or, when they are an inner tie rod end on a rack-and-pinion steering system, they are called inner socket assemblies. These joints are also used in a number of other non-automotive applications, from the joints of dolls to other mechanical linkages for a variety of devices, or any place where a degree of rotation in movement is desired.

== See also ==
- Head in pillow (metallurgy)
- List of auto parts
- Rod end bearing (heim joint)
- Shaker tilting chair (one of the earliest patented applications of the technology)
