= LAZ-695 =

Soviet/Ukrainian two-axle urban/suburban bus

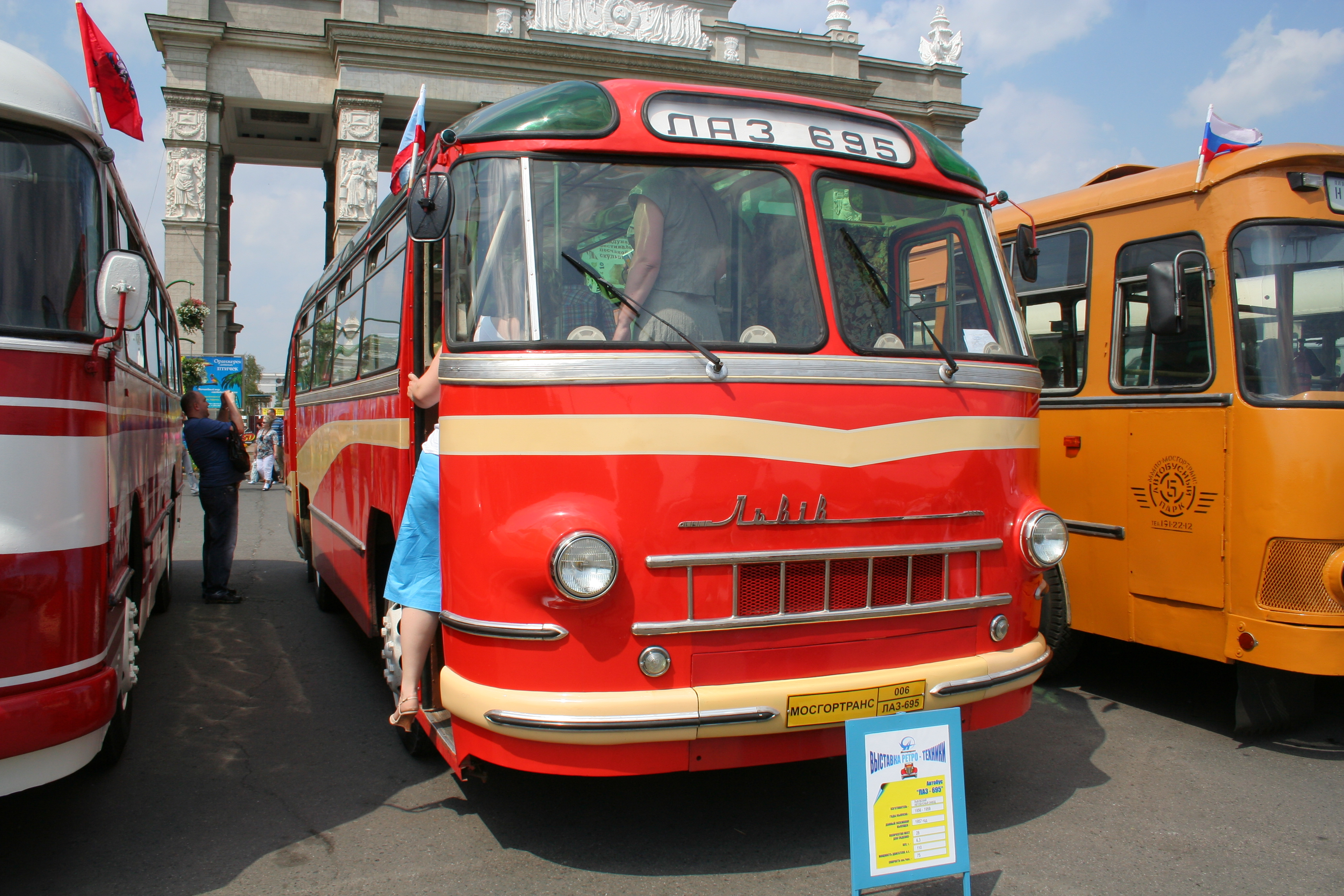
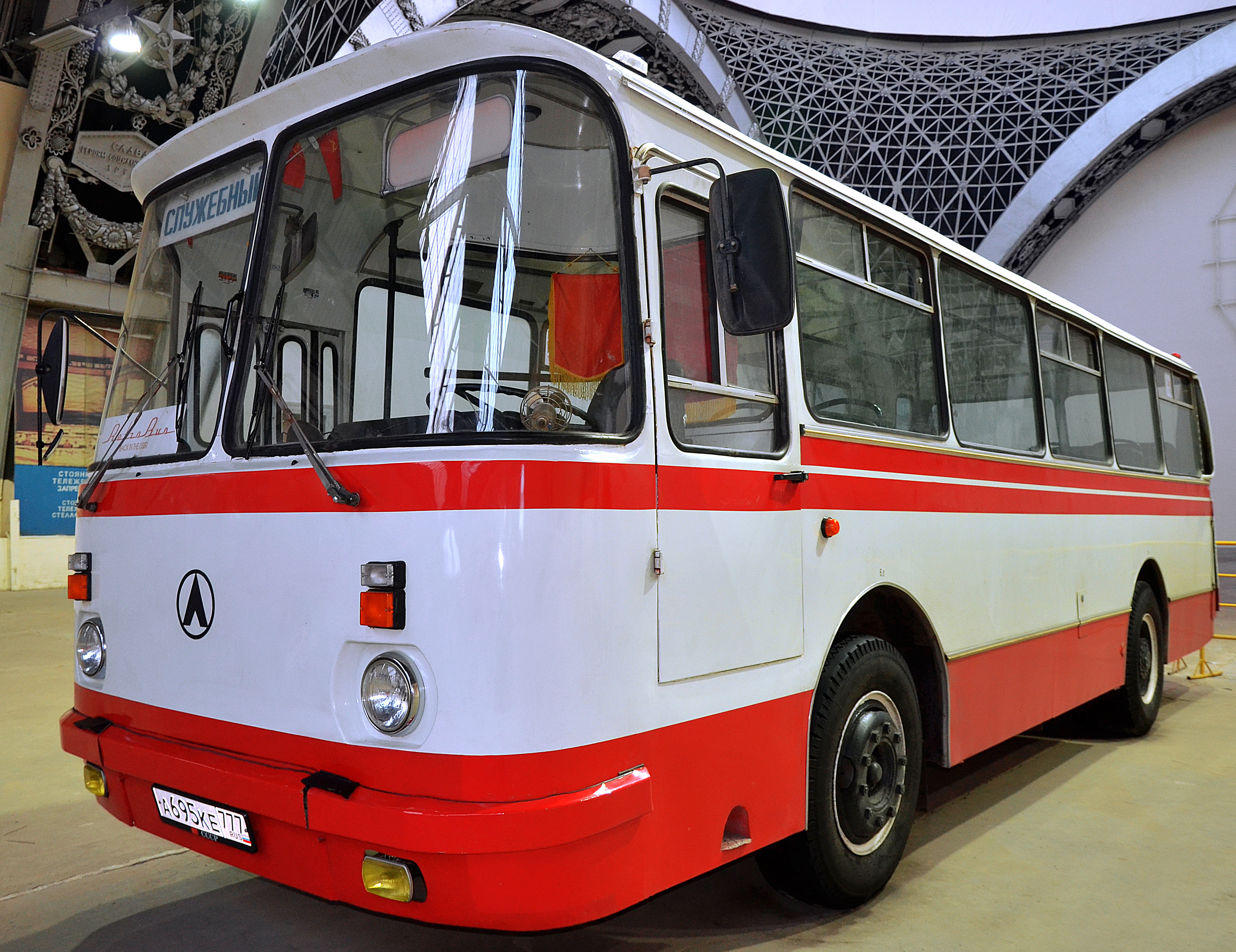
- First generation of LAZ-695 (above); LAZ-695N in the Moscow city transport museum (below)

Overview
- Manufacturer: (Ukrainian Soviet Socialist Republic) → (Ukraine) LAZ (1958–2002) (Ukraine) DAZ (1967–2026)
- Also called: DAZ-695
- Production: 1956-2010
- Model years: LAZ-695: 1956-1958; LAZ-695B: 1958-1964; LAZ-695E: 1964-1970; LAZ-695M: 1970-1976; LAZ-695N: 1976-2002; LAZ-695D: 1995-2002; DAZ-695: 2003-2010
- Assembly: (Ukrainian Soviet Socialist Republic) Lviv, Ukrainian SSR (56-91); Lviv, Ukraine (91-02); Kamianske, Ukraine (04-10)
- Designer: HSKB/VKEIautobusprom/Ukrautobusprom

Body and chassis
- Class: medium capacity bus
- Body style: high floor
- Layout: Rear-engine, rear-wheel-drive layout
- Platform: 4x2 chassis
- Related: LAZ-697, LAZ-699

Powertrain
- Engine: 5.6 L ZiL-124, in other sources “ZIL-158L” I6 (gasoline), 109 hp (LAZ-695); 5.6 L ZiL-120FB I6 (gasoline), 120 hp (LAZ-695B); 6 L ZiL-130L V8 (gasoline), 150 hp (LAZ-695E/M); 6 L ZiL-130Ya2N V8 (gasoline, gas), 150 hp (LAZ-695N/NG); 4.75 L MMZ-D245.9 I4 (diesel), 136 hp (LAZ-695D/D11); 11.2 L YAMZ-236A V6 (diesel), 193 hp (LAZ-695D11)
- Transmission: manual, 5-step; experimental automatic transmission (LAZ-695 Sz)

Dimensions
- Wheelbase: 4,190 mm (165.0 in)
- Length: 9,220 mm (363.0 in)
- Width: 2,500 mm (98.4 in)
- Height: 3,050 mm (120.1 in)
- Curb weight: 6,330 kg (13,955 lb) (LAZ-695/B/E); 6,800 kg (14,991 lb) (LAZ-695M/N/D)

Chronology
- Successor: LAZ-5252

The LAZ-695 is a Soviet/Ukrainian 2 axle urban/suburban bus, which was produced in the Western Ukrainian city Lviv from 1965 to 2002. After the production stopped at the main factory in Lviv, the documentation was handed over to the DAZ automotive facility in the Ukrainian city Kamianske, where the production continued up to 2010. In over 50 years of manufacturing there were over 250,000 units of various modifications built. This made the model one of the most widely used buses in the Soviet Union and the LAZ factory the biggest bus manufacturer in Europe in the 1980s. The bus belongs to the model series 69x, which includes also the LAZ-697 "Tourist" and the LAZ-699.

== History ==
Considerations to build a new factory, specialized on production of spare parts for heavy duty trucks in the Ukrainian city Lviv, were made by the Soviet government after the Second World War. The construction was finalized in 1949. In addition to truck cranes, like AK-32, LAZ-690 (both mounted on ZIS-150), the factory dealt also with the production of car spare parts and truck trailers, like LAZ-712 for the truck PAZ-657 and LAZ-729 for the truck ZIS-150.

At the beginning of the 1950s, the Soviet Union planned to create a new bus series that includes a lower class model, based on GAZ truck components, a middle-class model, based on ZIS trucks and an upper-class model, based on MAZ trucks. Thus, on March 17, 1955, the Ministry of Automotive, Tractor, and Agricultural Engineering of the USSR granted the task to develop several city bus prototypes with rear-engine design and space for 50 persons, of which 30 should be seat places. The intention was to replace the obsolete and virtually the only existing city bus model in the Soviet Union, ZIS-155.

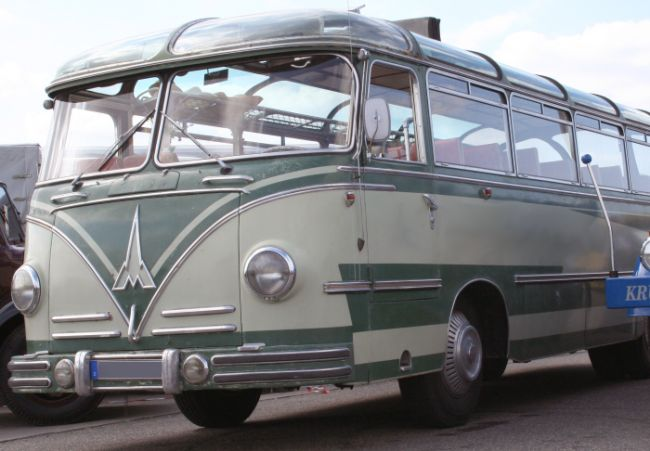
Magirus Deutz O3500H with a similar design

At that time the LAZ engineering team had sufficient construction experience from developing crane and trailer models in the previous years. The team also consisted of young and ambitious professionals focused on the idea of creating a completely new and progressive bus model.

For that goal, the Soviet Union ordered cutting edge bus models from West German manufacturers, among which are the Mercedes-Benz O 321 and Magirus-Deutz O3500H/O6500.

== Modifications ==
=== LAZ-695 (1956-1958) ===
Before the serial production began, seven prototypes were built. Some of them were profoundly different from the previous prototypes, with the others including only some minor changes and modifications.

==== First prototype ====
The first prototype was produced just in time for the 20th Congress of the Communist Party of the Soviet Union, on 12 February 1956, and got the name LAZ-695 "Lviv".

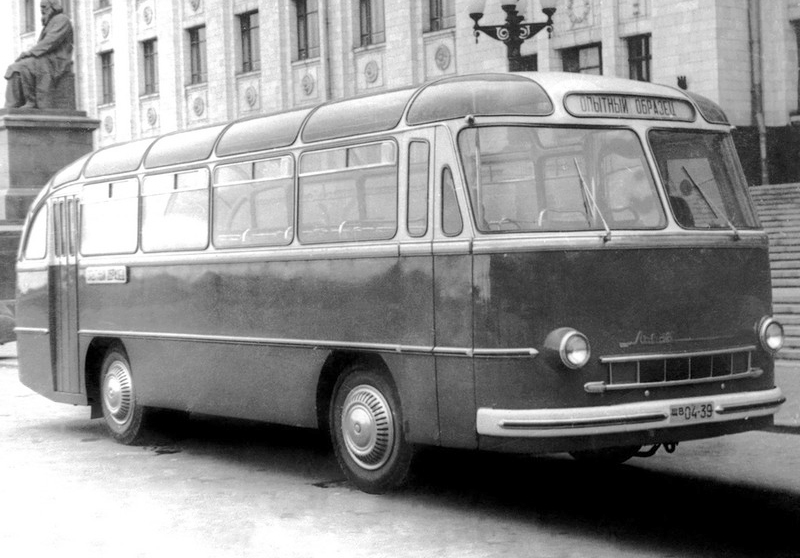
The first LAZ-695 prototype

For the first time in the Soviet Union, the bus received a rear-longitudinal-engine with rear-wheel-drive layout (Predecessors from ZIS had a front-engine-layout). For this purpose, a 6-cylinder engine ZIL-158L was installed, which was afterwards also used in the city bus ZIL-158. Atypical for the Soviet bus industry, the new body features a self-supporting integral body design. An integral design consists of extruded profiles that are collected into a grid frame along with other supporting components, such as engine and axles.

Another cutting edge feature was the leaf spring suspension system. It had a stabilized stiffness and was independently from the load case. In front of every window leaf were installed little transparent plexiglass air reflectors. It was a specific feature of all prototypes, but was removed from the serial models due to bigger window leafs.

The main windows used a highly durable type of glass called stalinite, which was invented in Donbas glass factories in 1934. The rear entrance door consisted of 4 foldable segments and opened pneumatically inwards and the front two-segment door opened manually outwards.

The wheel rims have chrome-plated hubcaps. This feature was retained in all prototypes and serial models and have become a distinctive attribute of the 695/697 and 699 series, respectively. The first prototype was still very rudimentary after it rolled out of the factory. As such, it was greatly modified during the subsequent experiments. One of the main weaknesses was the inner space design, which is too narrow for a vehicle advertised as a bus for urban use. Likewise, the doors were too small and offered not enough place for increased passenger flow. Another major problem was the engine cooling system. Due to the rear-engine layout, the radiator takes insufficient cooling air volume. The lateral air intakes did not help solve the problem.

==== Second prototype ====
The second prototype was built in June 1956, in Moscow. The passenger's comfort was increased and paired soft seats, based on spongy rubber and sheathed with semi-synthetic textile, were installed. The rear door was removed completely and the front one was replaced by a one-segment door, which had to be opened manually.

These constructive solutions led to even bigger inner space problems, but now, the bus was no longer advertised as a city bus. Instead, it was classified as a suburban bus. Such a bus type operated between cities and nearby suburban and rural areas and had rarely to stop during the trip.

On the plate, the nickname “Lviv” was now written in the Ukrainian language. The front and rear wheel arches had a different design and the lateral moldings were moved slightly lower. The indicator form at the front were moved under the main lights. Although the number of air intakes were increased and the engine hood now have air slots, the problem with engine cooling persisted.

==== Third prototype ====
The third prototype from October 1956 was based on the first one and was once again classified as an urban bus. There were only a few minor design changes. The bus was tested on the 55th bus route in Moscow. The fifth prototype of the LAZ-695 was created in January 1957 based on the insights made during the test drives.

External images
- LAZ-695 prototypes
- First Prototype, View from rear
- Second Prototype
- Second prototype, inner space
- Third prototype
- Fourth Prototype
- Entry door of the fourth prototype
- Fifth prototype
- Sixth prototype
- Seventh prototype
- Dashboard of the seventh prototype

==== Fourth prototype ====
In the meantime, a further modification of the second, suburban prototype was created. It only differed externally though, technically, it remained the same.

The number of seats were decreased from 34 to 32. As in the first suburban prototype, the front door consisted of one part. When the door opened, a step extended, to make it easier for passengers to get in and out. The back door was completely removed.

The glazed area of the roof was increased. The front region consisted of three panes of tinted glass. This led to improved brightness within the bus but was a functional disadvantage. The middle pane took the attachment point of the indicator board.

The overheating engine remained the biggest problem. In an attempt to address the issue, the middle pane of the rear window was removed. Instead, there was an air intake that led the air from the roof to the engine.

==== Fifth prototype ====
The fifth prototype is considered to be the direct precursor of the first serial LAZ-695. The only detail that reveals the bus as a prototype is the absence of the tinting of the roof panes. In summer 1957 a little serial production began when about 100 buses were ordered for a festival of the youth and students in Moscow.

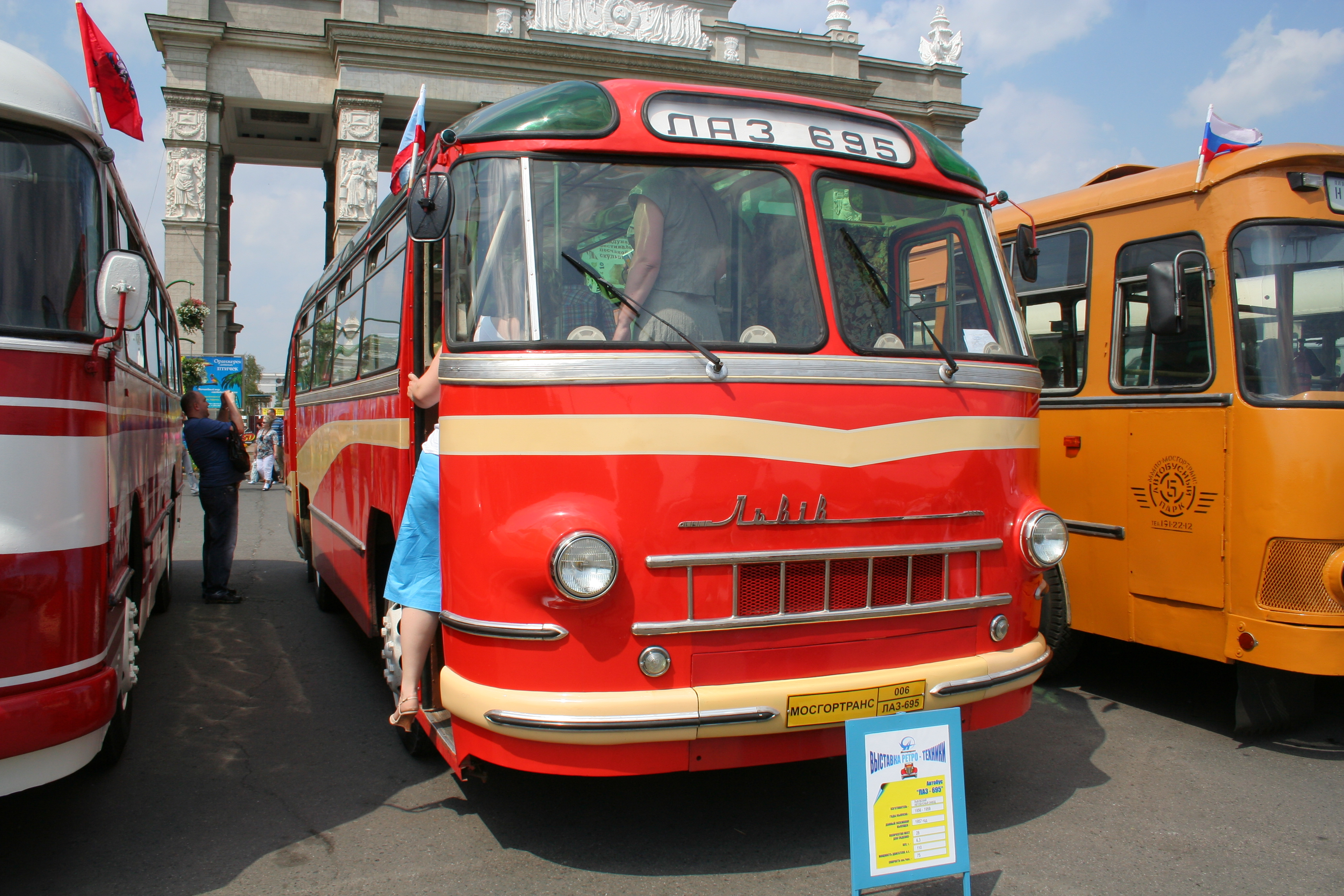
A serial LAZ-695 "Festival"

The bus' nickname “Festival” was derived from this event. The main part was produced in the second half of the year 1957. For the whole year, 303 units were produced. The serial production continued until May 1958 and according to some data, about 1000 buses were built. After this, the bus front design was changed and many functionless and decorative details were removed, including the "Lviv" lettering and the false radiator grille.

One example of the LAZ-695 “Festival” remained until today and was restored in the Moscow city transport museum.

==== Sixth prototype ====
Parallel to the serial production of the LAZ-695 “Festival”, in summer 1957, the engineers from LAZ also created another prototype with suburban modifications. The sixth prototype had a different front roof window with two panes instead of three and a single panorama window (the older prototypes had a double front window). In the inner space, mesh shelves over the seats were installed, so the passengers had an option to store their luggage. Curtains on the windows helped to keep the heat influx low. On the front, a big “L” letter appeared instead of the lettering “Lviv”. The letter “L” on the front became an important and distinctive symbol of all subsequent LAZ bus models.

==== Seventh prototype ====
The last prototype, a further development of the sixth one, was created in December 1957. It was more of a tourist bus than a suburban version, offering a high level of comfort. After 1957 the suburban and tourist versions were separated from the 695 line and received an independent model designation 697.

=== LAZ-695B (1958-1964) ===
LAZ-695B is the second serial modification and was produced from May 1958 until 1964. There were a lot of interesting special sub modifications.

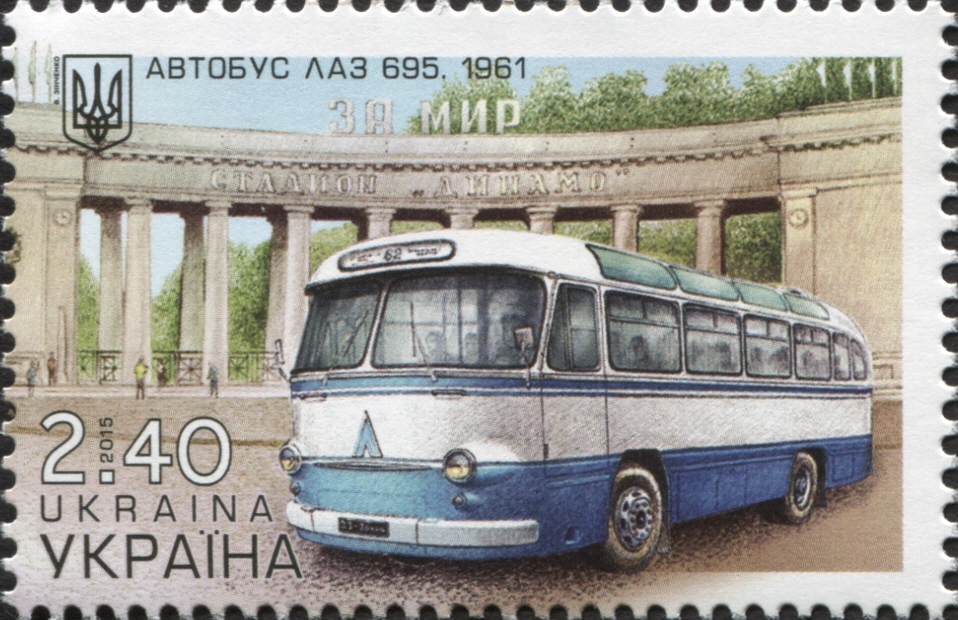
LAZ-695B on a Ukrainian stamp from 2015

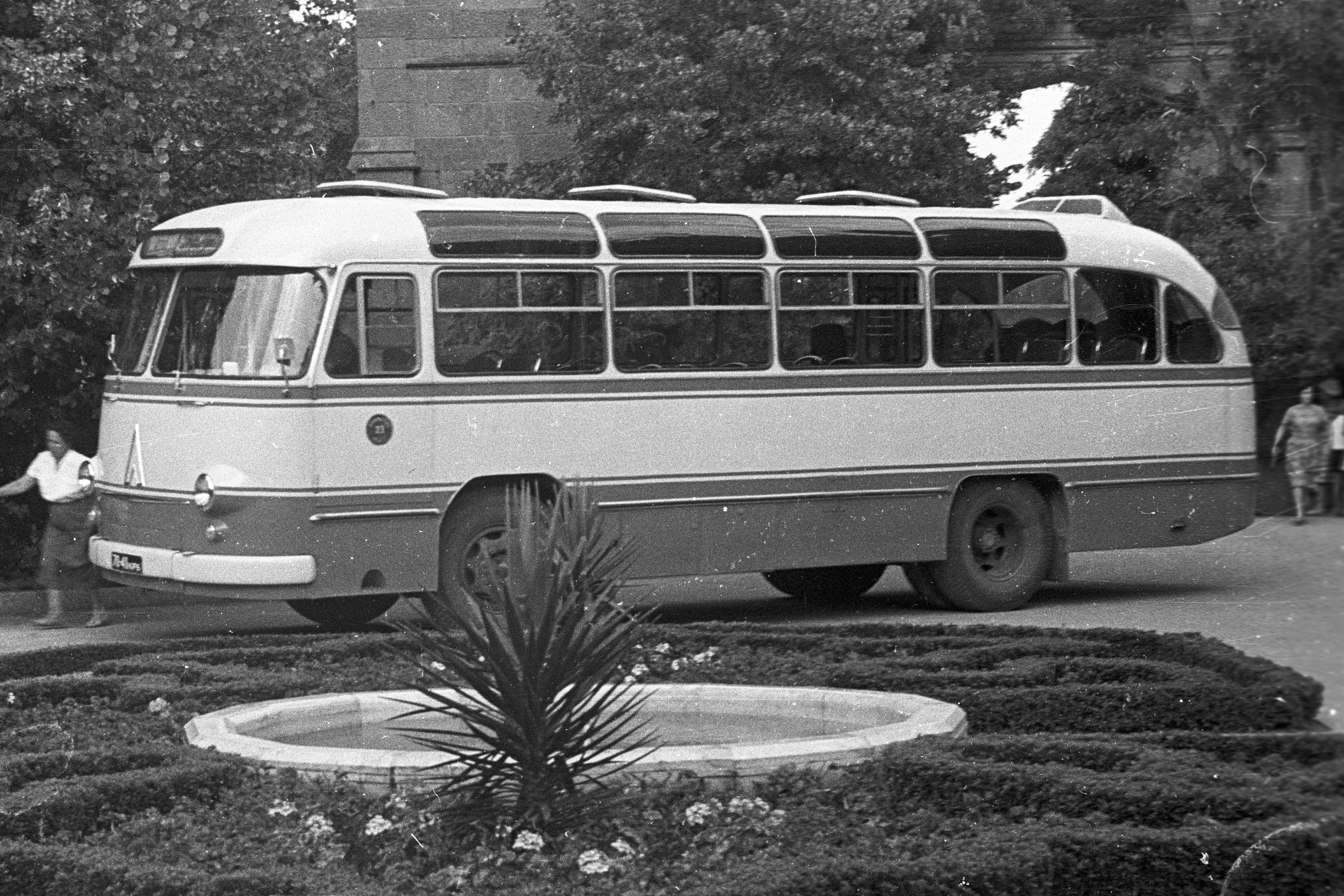
LAZ-695B on the Crimea in the 60th

==== LAZ-695B prototype ====
Due to haste in the development of the first version and ill-considered borrowing of ideas from western counterparts, the LAZ-695 had a lot of flaws. In 1958 a consumer conference take place. The participants were a citizen (typical passengers) and operators of the LAZ-695. The main critical point was the weak construction of the body. The engineers are alread aware of it, but had to find the golden mean between elegance and stability. The glazed roof disappeared entirely at the development stage of the LAZ-695M modification.

The second critical point was the impractical inner space. The width of entry and exit doors was too narrow and in the vicinity of the door a passenger accumulation platform was missing. As such, it was difficult to characterize the vehicle as a city bus. Moreover, there appeared new competitors from ZiL and PAZ, which offered better bus models for urban purposes.

External image
- Front view of the LAZ-695B prototype

Also, for suburban areas, a more suitable competitor existed, the ZiS-127. These led to the creation of the LAZ-695B prototype with entirely different roof construction. The panes were removed. The front of the bus got a bigger window, an indicator board was installed, and the doors got wider. Also, an experimental pneumatic suspension on all wheels was installed. Although a huge work has been done and the tests gave good results, the LAZ-695B prototype was built only in one exemplar.

==== Serial LAZ-695B ====
External images
- Serial LAZ-695
- LAZ-695B
- LAZ-695B, Rear view
- LAZ-695B, Inner space

Instead of putting the LAZ-695B prototype into production, a new modification for serial purposes was created in 1958, which included elements of the first LAZ-695 models as well as of the improved LAZ-695B prototype. The transparent plexiglass air reflectors on the window leafs disappeared because they broke quickly.

The model featured the modernized ZIS-120 engine, 120-hp ZIL-120FB.

==== LAZ-695B weight-optimized version ====
In 1959 a weight-optimized version of the serial LAZ-695B model was produced. In the course of the modernization, many interior parts including the seats, exterior sheathing parts, and engine components, were replaced by analogues made of fiberglass or nylon. As a result, the weight of the bus was reduced by 400 kg. Compared to the total weight of a serial LAZ-695B (6330 kg), 400 kg is, from the Soviet view, insignificant. Furthermore, the lighter parts led to a weaker construction.

LAZ-695B ambulance

External images
- LAZ-695B ambulance
- LAZ-695B ambulance
- Schematic representation of the ambulance vehicle LAZ-695B

After the invasion by Nazi Germany during World War II, the Soviet Union saw a high demand in ambulance vehicles and retrofitted their buses for these purposes. After the war, the problem changed and the country lacks in a vehicle for transporting people. Military ambulance vehicles were converted back into buses. This recognition led to the post-war intention to create vehicles, especially trucks and buses that, in case of war, could be quickly and simply converted into military vehicles.

In 1959, the leadership of the LAZ factory decided to develop an ambulance modification of the LAZ-695, which would meet the previously mentioned requirements. The retrofitting process was passed to the ZiL factory in Moscow.

Due to the rear-engine body layout, there were many restrictions. The stretcher with injured soldiers could not be loaded over the flap in the back of the bus. Instead, a small lid at the left side of the bus was built in. From then on, every LAZ-695, especially of the first series, feature this flap. As such, in case of war, every civil model could be quickly converted into a provisional ambulance car.

In the military version of the LAZ-695B, the wounded on stretchers could be positioned in three or two rows on floor stands as well as on suspension mounts, in two or three tiers. For the medical personnel, there were two side banks and three comfortable, soft seats at the back. Initially, the plan was to create different versions of the ambulance bus, such as a surgery bus. Depending on the version, it was possible to transport from 10 to 18 wounded on stretchers or 7 to 23 sitting persons, respectively. The bus was rigorously tested by the military but was never produced serially. Instead, special books were written describing how to do a fast conversion of Soviet civilian buses, including LAZ-695, into ambulances for military purposes.

==== LAZ-695B for astronauts ====
External image
- Yuri Gagarin in a LAZ-695B

In the 60th, the Baikonur Cosmodrome need a special vehicle for the transportation of the astronauts, with their heavy equipment and suits, to the cosmodromes. Normative restrictions and requirements did not exist, only wishes and recommendations. As the base, a serial LAZ-695B was chosen and every component was checked several times. Furthermore, the bus got an anti-corrosive coating. In the inner space, a table, normal seats for personal and big seats were installed, so the astronauts could fit in with their suits. Also, there were installed means of communication, fans, phones and equipment for filming the astronauts. The bus was hermetically sealed. This was important to protect the astronautic equipment from dust. After finishing the construction, the bus was inspected by a special state commission. They were very satisfied with the quality of the bus. On 12 April 1961, the bus was used to bring the first astronaut in Outer space, Yuri Gagarin, to the Vostok spacecraft. In 1967 the bus was replaced by a special version of the successor modification LAZ-695E. In 1984 it was brought to the LAZ factory, where it was fully restored. It is not known where the unique modification is today.

==== LAZ-695Zh (1963-1965) ====
External image
- Automtatic transmission GMP LAZ-NAMI 695 Zh2 from the LAZ-695Sz

In the 60th, soviet cities begun to growth quickly. The municipal fleets needed modern vehicles with reliable parts. The buses of that time did not match these requirements, especially because they were equipped with manual and weak gearboxes. An automatic transmission would be a better and more reliable solution on high frequent urban routes. Accordingly, already at the end of the 50th, the LAZ factory, together with NAMI, begun to develop a modern, fully automated hydrodynamic transmission, especially for urban buses. The development was finalized in 1963 and firstly installed on the serial LAZ-695B. Due to its importance, the modification got its own index Zh, although, except of the transmission, it was identical to the LAZ-695B. Only the engine was slightly modified for the purposes of the new automatic transmission, too. The LAZ-695Zh was produced only 2 years, until 1965 and there were built only 40 units. Afterwards, the new transmission was installed in the modern LiAZ-677 that was better suitable for urban purposes. The success of the new transmission was outstanding. There were produced about 200,000 units of the LiAZ-677 with that transmission, partially developed at the LAZ factory.

==== LAZ-695T (1962-1965) ====
External images
- Trolleybuses based on the LAZ-695
- BTL-62
- ODAZ-695T

Firstly a trolleybus, based on a LAZ-695B, was created in Baku and got the name BTL-62. The first serial trolleybus on the base of a LAZ-695B, at the LAZ factory, was created in summer 1963. Only 10 units were produced, all of which were used in the city of Lviv. The production was relocated to the factory of electrical transport KZET in Kyiv, where the vehicle got the nomination Kyiv-5LA. The LAZ factory delivered the raw bus bodies to the manufacturer in Kyiv. Here only the electrical components were installed. From 1963 to 1964 there were produced 75 trolleybuses of the model Kyiv-5LA. But the production capacity of the KZET facility was insufficient and already in the same year, 1963, the car assembly manufacturer in Odesa, OdAZ, begun to produce the OdAZ-695T trolleybus on the base of the LAZ-695B. From 1963 to 1965, 476 units were built for nearby cities. The LAZ trolleybuses were lighter, more economical and manoeuvrable, compared to other typical soviet trolleybuses of that time. The trolleybus could reach a maximum speed of 50 Kilometers per hour, thanks to a 78 kW electrical motor. The electrical components of the propulsion system were placed in the inner space that already was narrow. Other disadvantages were the small doors, which were borrowed from the base model LAZ-695B and E, respectively, and the short lifespan of only 7–8 years. Notwithstanding, that modification helped to minimize the deficit in trolleybuses on soviet streets.

=== LAZ-695E (1964-1969) ===
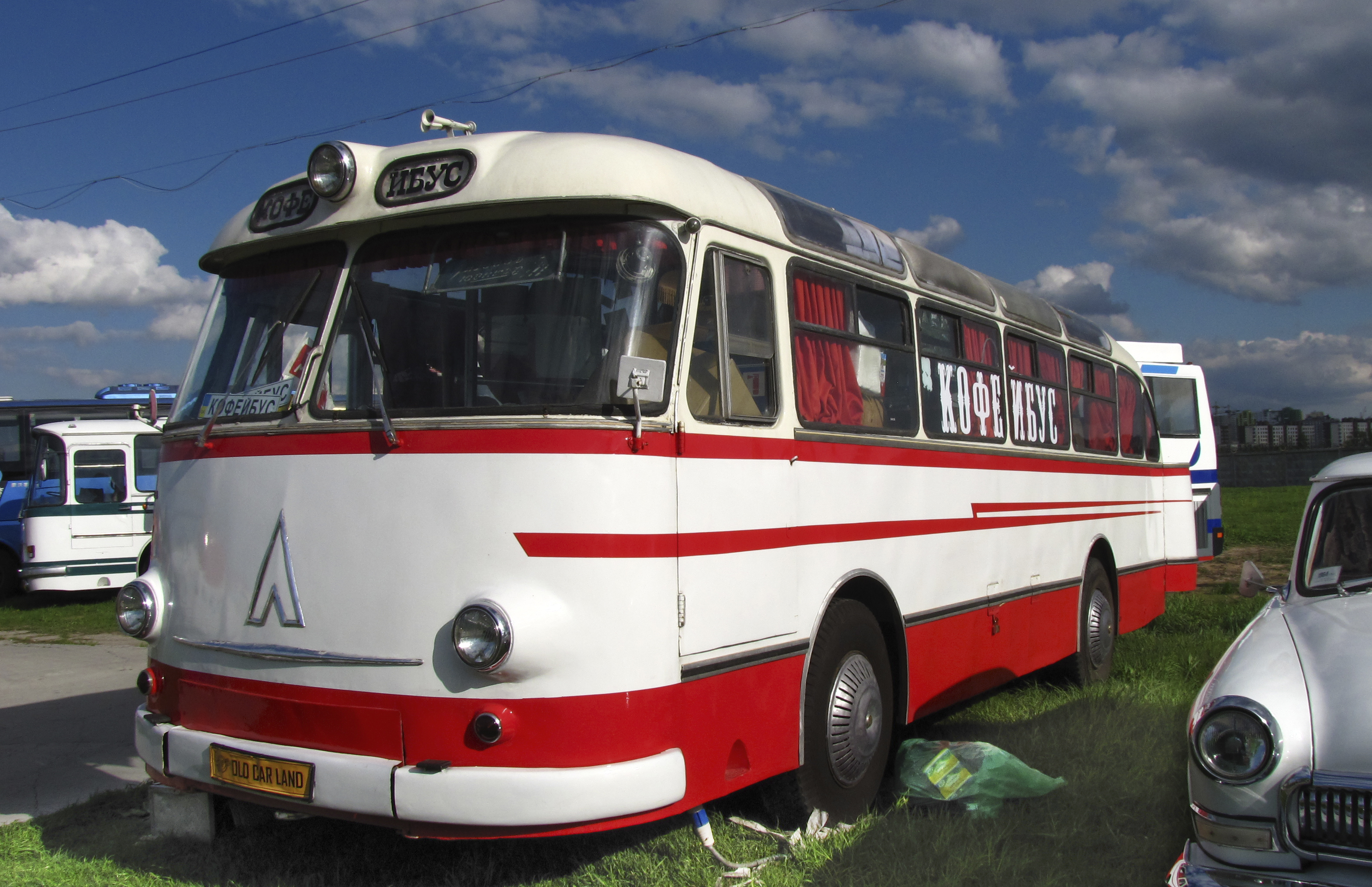
LAZ-695E (Leningrád) Ermitázs

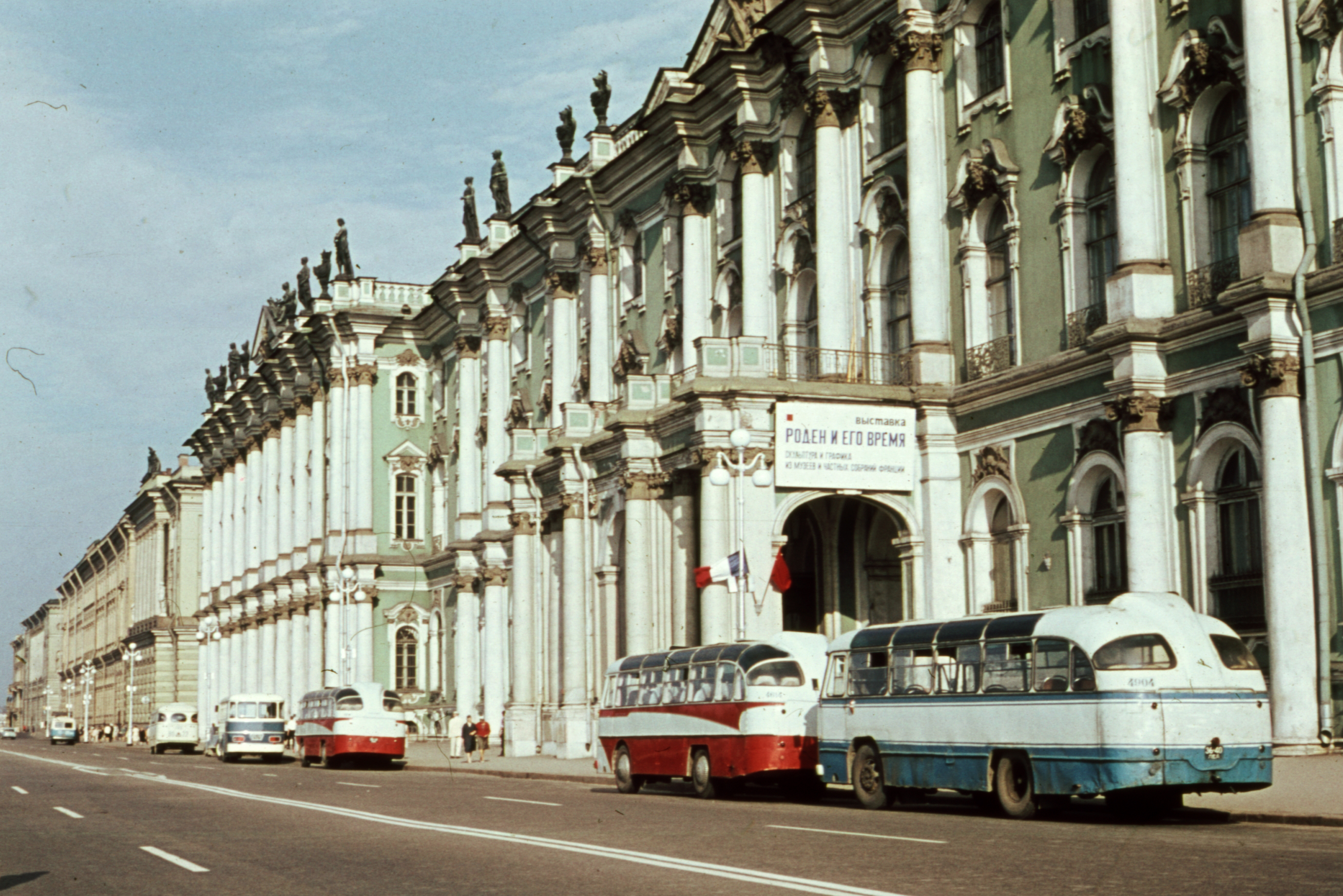
LAZ-695E from rear (blue), compare to the touristic model LAZ-697E (red) in Leningrad

The LAZ-695E was equipped with a new V8-engine ZiL-130L, with a power of 150 kW. The model got a new, more effective transmission and clutch from the truck ZiL-130. The first prototype was finalized in 1961 and was integrated in serial production only in 1963. In the first year were produced 394 units. There were only few visual differences between the predecessor and LAZ-695E, like ventilation hatches. Only in 1964 the outer appearance changed greatly. The form of the wheel arches became rounder. Moreover, the front and rear axles got a Wheel hub assembly as well as rims from ZiL-158. From 1964 to 1969 there were produced about 38000 units, of which 1350 were exported in different countries. On the last units there was installed an electropneumatic door control drive system.

=== LAZ-695M (1969-1976) ===
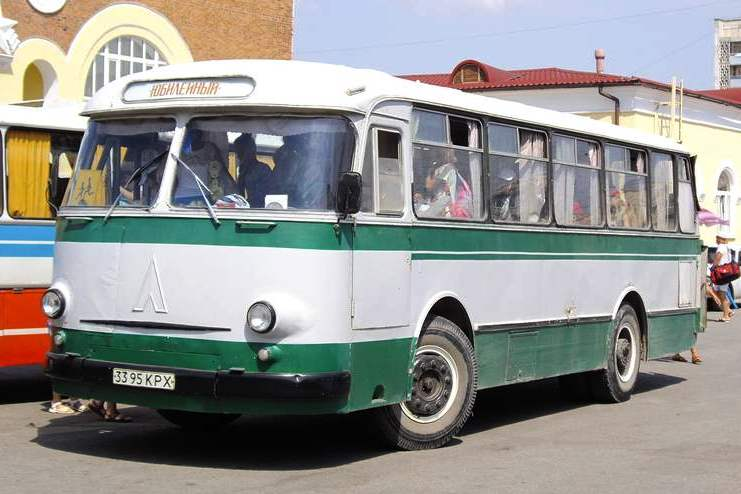
LAZ-695M (1974)

External image
- LAZ 695M First prototype

LAZ-695 was a profound modification of the LAZ-695E. From 1969 to 1976 there were produced 52000 units, 164 of them for the export. The side windows increased by 150 mm and the windows frames became slimmer. Roof windows disappeared completely, and the roof became more flat. The central air intake on the back roof area was replaced by lateral air intakes, beneath the rear windows, on the humpback. The rear axles, with a planetary transmission in the wheel hubs, were delivered from the Hungarian automaker Raba. Also a separate brake drive was introduced into the new construction.

=== LAZ-695N (1976-2002) ===
External images
- Prototypes of the LAZ-695N
- First tests of the LAZ-695N in 1970
- First prototype of the LAZ-695N

The first LAZ-695N prototypes were built in summer 1969. Compared to the LAZ-695M, the new buses got a new, flatter front, with bigger windows. The door dimensions were the same at the front and the rear. Initially the doors consisted of two parts but then were changed to four-segment doors. Those doors were used on most soviet buses, trolleybuses and trams. The rear part of the bus remained identical to the predecessor LAZ-695M modification. Only on the prototype from 1974, the rear part was profoundly changed, too. The air intakes, which in earlier models were positioned beneath the rear window, were relocated behind the rearmost lateral one. The serial production began in 1976. The first vehicles had rectangular driving lights from East Germany, which were also used on the Moskvitch 412 passenger car. Since the mid-80s the bus was equipped with the typical for soviet trucks, cheaper and more accessible round lights. Until 1991, the bus had to be equipped with a flap under the windshield. As already described in the part “LAZ-695B ambulance”, it was intended to use the bus as an ambulance in the case of war. The front door would serve as a loading flap for a stretcher. In the 90s the bus remains unchanged. From 1976 to 2002, 160,000 units were produced, which made the bus the most built model at the LAZ plant.

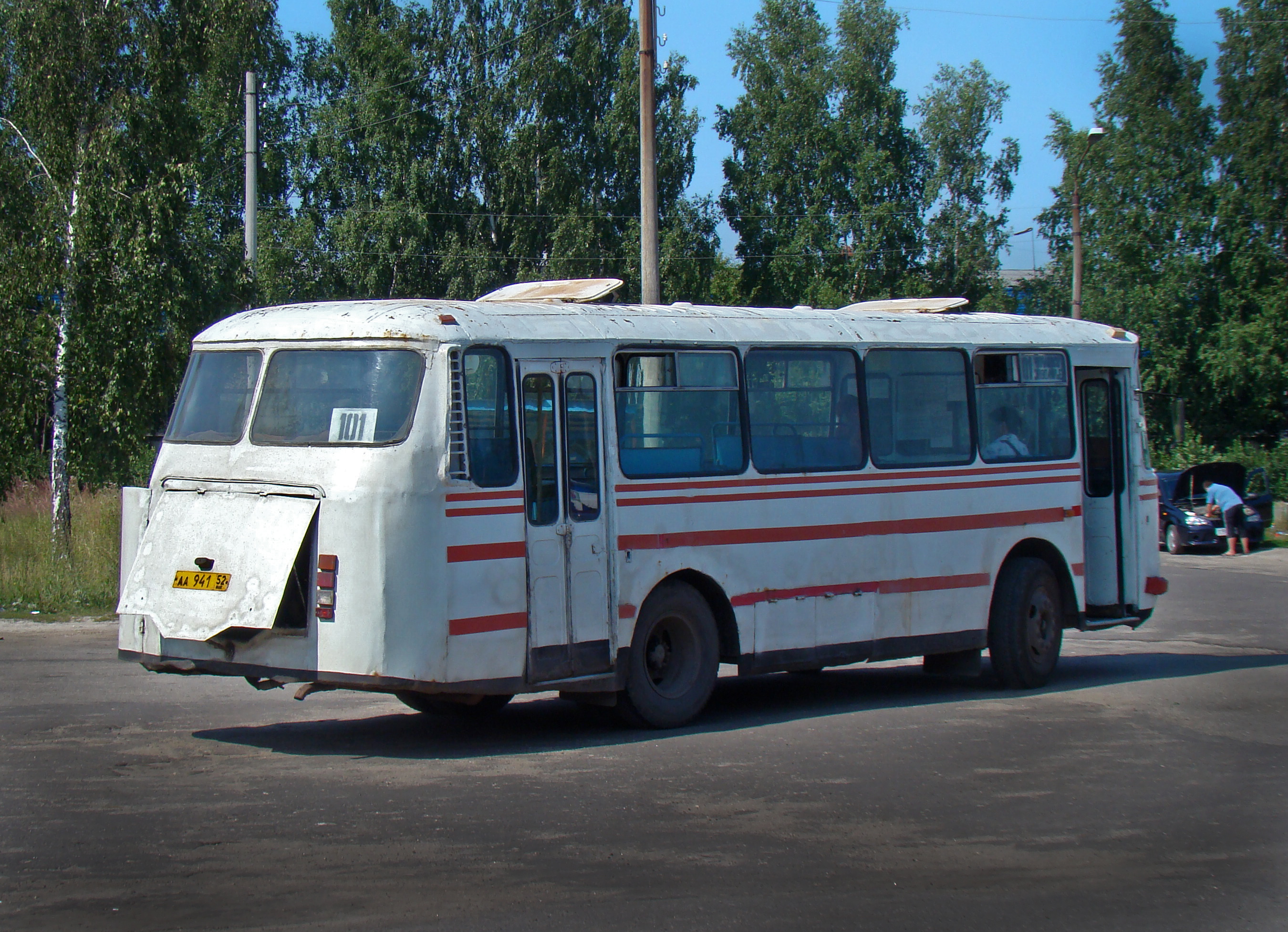
LAZ-695N from back

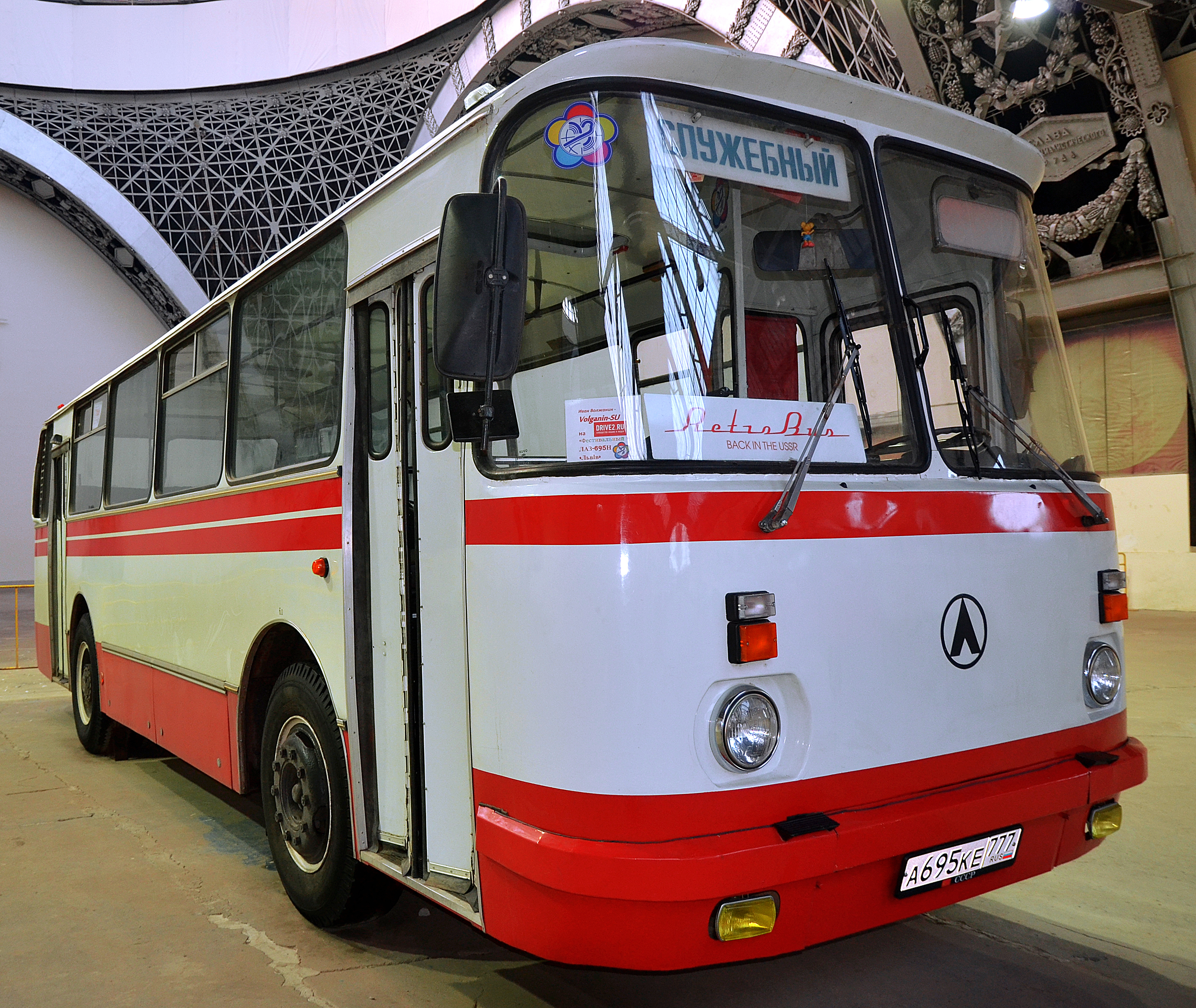
An early version of the 695N modification with a flap on the left side

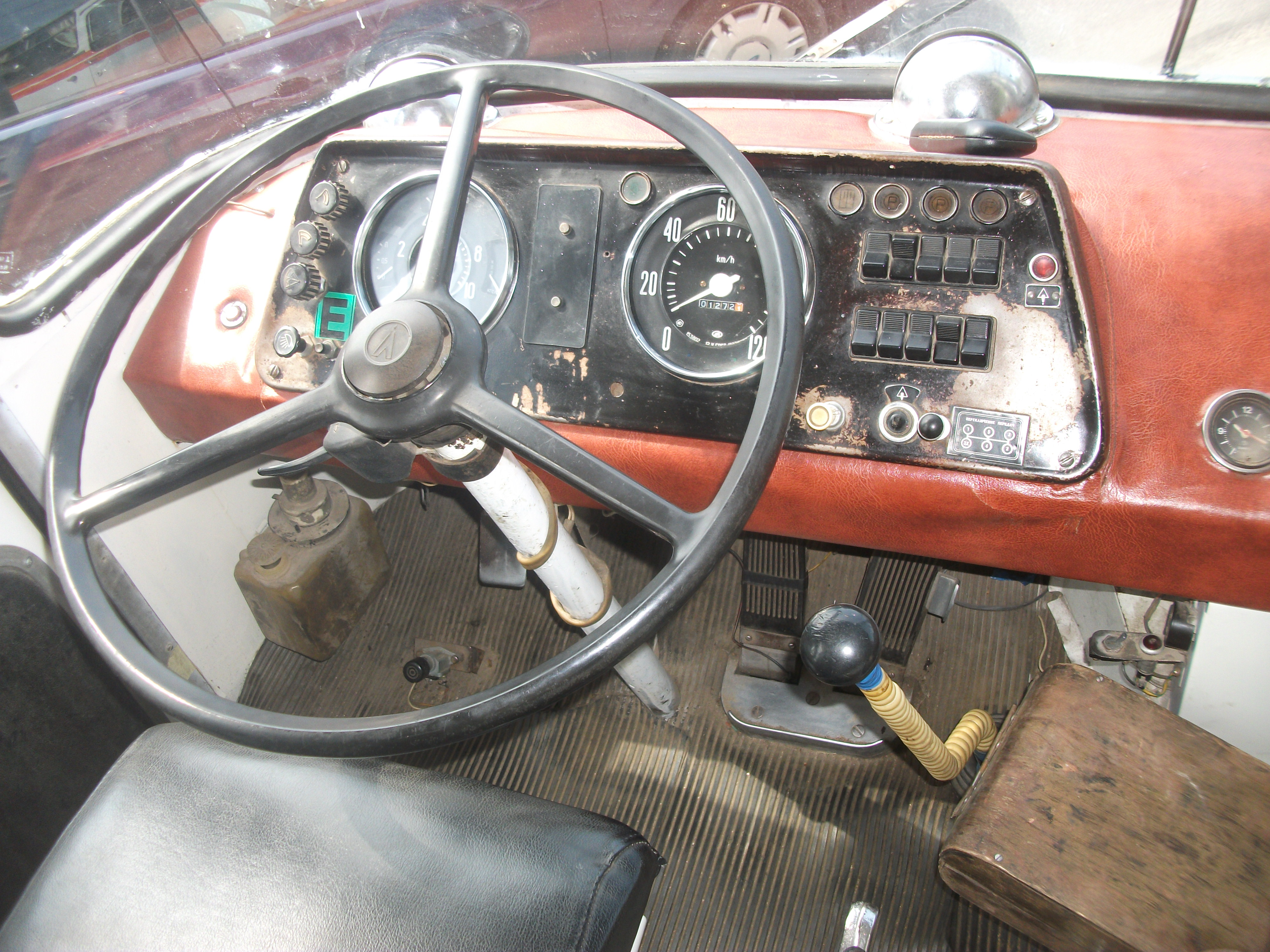
The driver place of a LAZ-695N

==== LAZ-695NE/LAZ-695NT ====
The LAZ-695NE was a special export version for countries with temperate climate and the LAZ-695NT for countries with humid and arid climate.

==== LAZ-695R (1979-1985) ====
For the 1980 Summer Olympics a special modification of the bus was created, which later was also exported to other countries. The bus had two-section doors, instead of four, with a modern drive system. The bus had different and more comfortable seats and a number of other improvements. From 1979 to 1985 there were produced 3448 units.

==== LAZ-692 (1986) ====
External images
- LAZ-695/692 in action during the Chernobyl disaster
- LAZ-695N during decontamination process in Chernobyl
- LAZ-692
- Graveyards of technic in Chernobyl Exclusion Zone

The Chernobyl disaster in 1986 required a huge number of vehicles to fight the consequences. Buses like the LAZ-695 were used in huge numbers to evacuate residents of the nearby city Pripyat. But for the liquidators and people who worked in the immediate vicinity of the reactor, a normal vehicle did not provide sufficient protection. For that purpose, special vehicle modifications were created. Beneath them the LAZ-692, which offer protection from radioactive dust and Gamma rays. As the base was used the LAZ-695N. The buses were equipped with lead sheets, which covered the biggest part of all windows, except the driver window. The hatches were removed from the roof, replaced by an inner space air filtration system. After the liquidation process, they were all destroyed and buried on “graveyards of technic” in the Chernobyl Exclusion Zone.

==== LAZ-695NG (1985-2002) ====
The main problem of soviet buses was their high fuel consumption, mainly because they had gasoline engines. The first attempts to power them by natural gas, which was abundant in the Soviet Union, were made in the 80s. As an experimental vehicle was used the LAZ-695N modification. As a result, the NG-modification with 8 gas cylinders on the roof, appeared. The serial production began only in 1985. The NG model had less power, but it was sufficient for urban and suburban routes. The natural gas-powered engines were more ecological and polluted less. Also, the fuel consumption was lower. There was also a LAZ-695P modification, powered by propane gas. About 8000 units were produced until 2002. After the dissolution of the Soviet Union and the dramatic increase of fuel prices, a lot of gasoline-powered LAZ-695N buses were also converted into gas powered models by special authorized organizations.

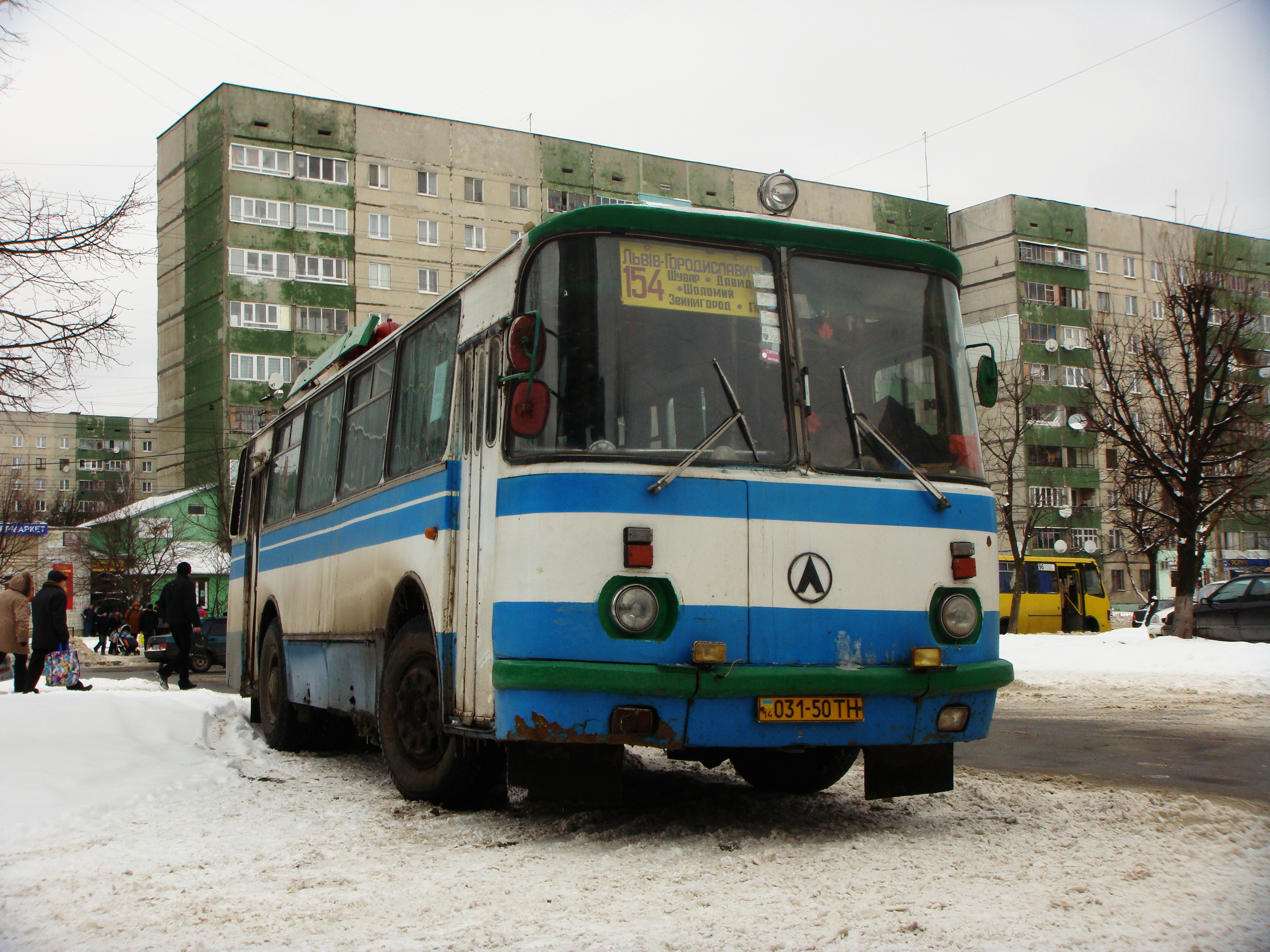
LAZ-695NG with the gas cylinders on the roof, front view

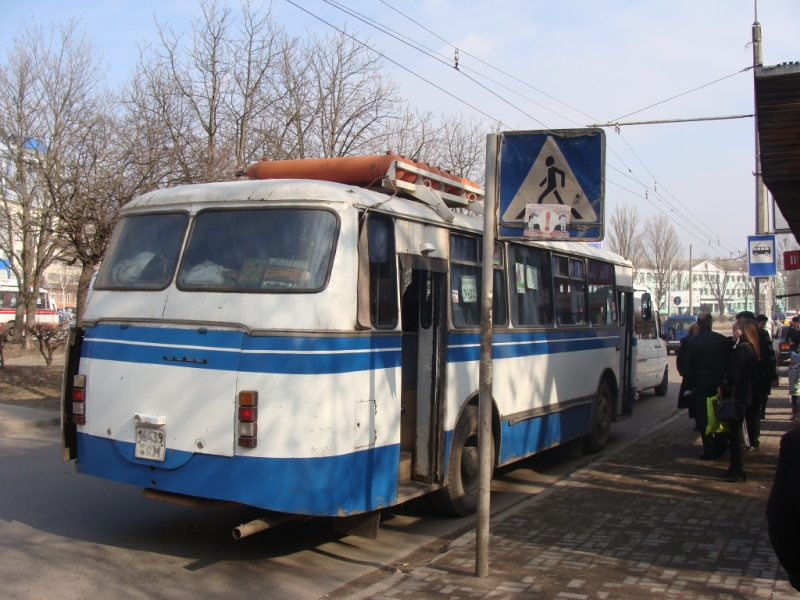
LAZ-695NG with the gas cylinders on the roof, view from the rear

==== LAZ-695D (1995-2002) ====
External images
- Diesel versions of the LAZ-695N
- LAZ-695D “Dana”
- LAZ-695 D11 "Tanya"

The idea to create a diesel-powered bus at the LAZ factory was not new. But the plans were every time postponed into the far future, particularly because there was no need for such a type of engine in the Soviet Union, due to the abundance in Gasoline. Only after the Dissolution of the Soviet Union and the rise of fuel prices, a gasoline-powered engine on a bus became fully obsolete. After a successful introduction of a gas-powered modification already in the 80th, in 1993 a diesel-powered prototype, with the nickname “Dana”, was created on the base of the LAZ-695N. Because lacking experience, the constructors could not decide which engine would be the best. So in following years different diesel engines, from soviet manufacturers, were installed experimentally on serial bus models. Favourites were the D6112 engine from the T-150 tractor, which were produced at the HZTD, a tractor engine production facility in Kharkiv, and the 494L engine from military vehicles. Also LAZ subsidiaries and other transportation organizations dealt with the search for the right diesel engine. A LAZ service center from Dnipro installed the SMD-2307 engine, which was also used on ZIL-4331, the successor of the ZIL-130. The diesel had a power of 170 kW and a torque of 668 Nm at 2400 rpm. Meanwhile, the interstate automotive trade association propose to install the inline-four D245.9 diesel, from the Belarusian Minsk Motor plant. The engine had a power of 100 kW This choice turned out to be successful and from 1995 a serial production of the LAZ-695D begun. After only one year, the diesel powered model was profoundly modified and got the name LAZ-695D11 “Tanya”. The bus got front and rear swing doors and comfortable soft seats. These features remembered on the former intercity bus model LAZ-697, which was no longer manufactured at that time. So the new modification should occupy the intercity niche. The buses were produced serial but in small quantities, with the engine YAMZ-236A.

=== DAZ-695 (2004-2010) ===
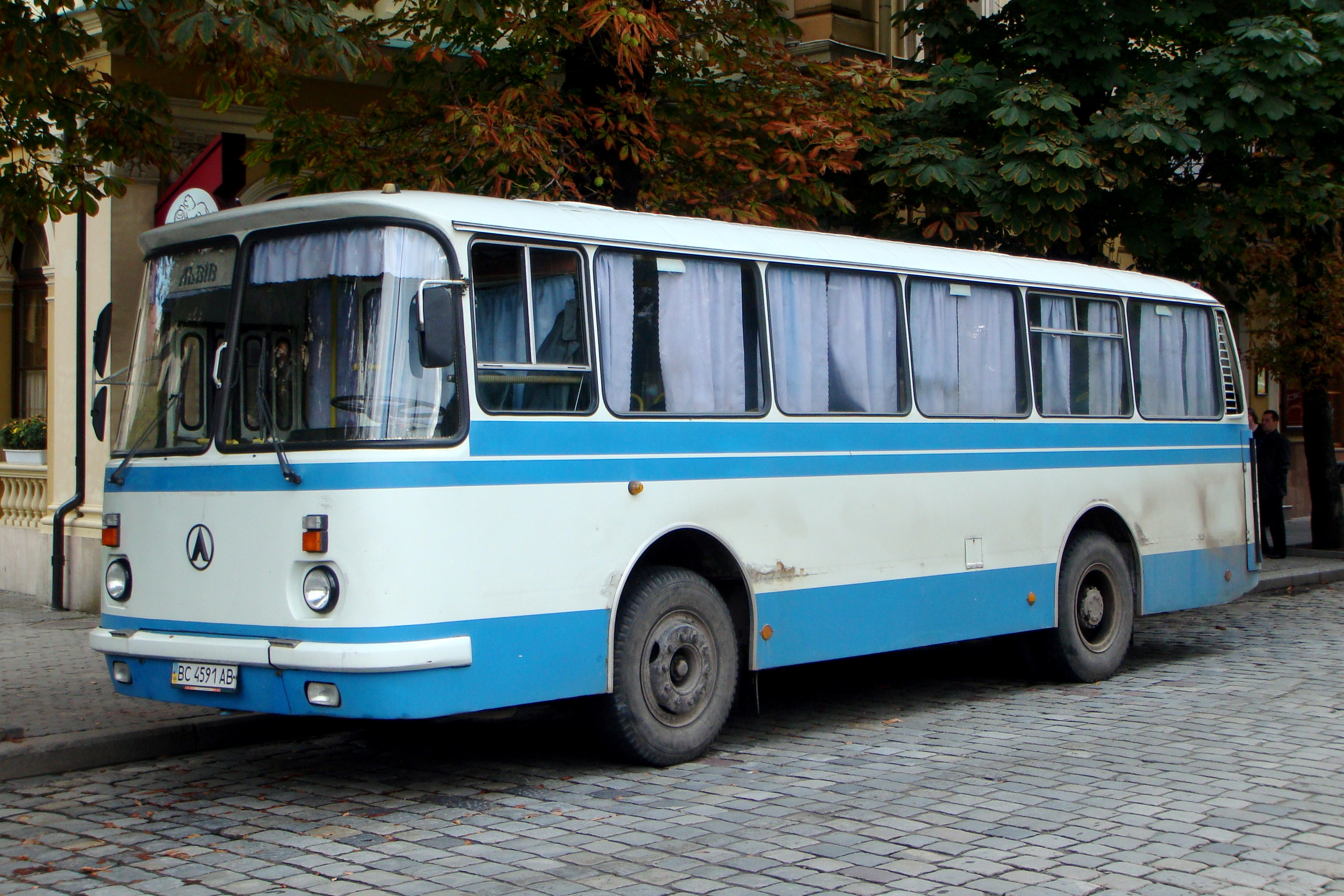
DAZ-695N, recognizable by the missing driver doors and lateral mouldings

After the DAZ bus manufacturer became a subsidiary of the LAZ organization in 2002, the production of the N, D and NG modifications were relocated there and continued until 2011. In the last year of production, the factory built the buses from leftover spare parts. Although made with obsolete technology, the buses were in great demand due to their low prices and proven construction. The few differences were the missing driver door on the left, the missing lateral mouldings, yellow handrails, and different brake components.

== The end of production ==
After the fall of the Soviet Union, the LAZ factory lost its leading role as a bus manufacturer. In the 90s, production decreased. There were many new models to be used as the successor to the 695 model, like the LAZ-4202, but none could achieve its success, due to poor technical quality. The buses of the last production years are still in use in some Post-Soviet states.

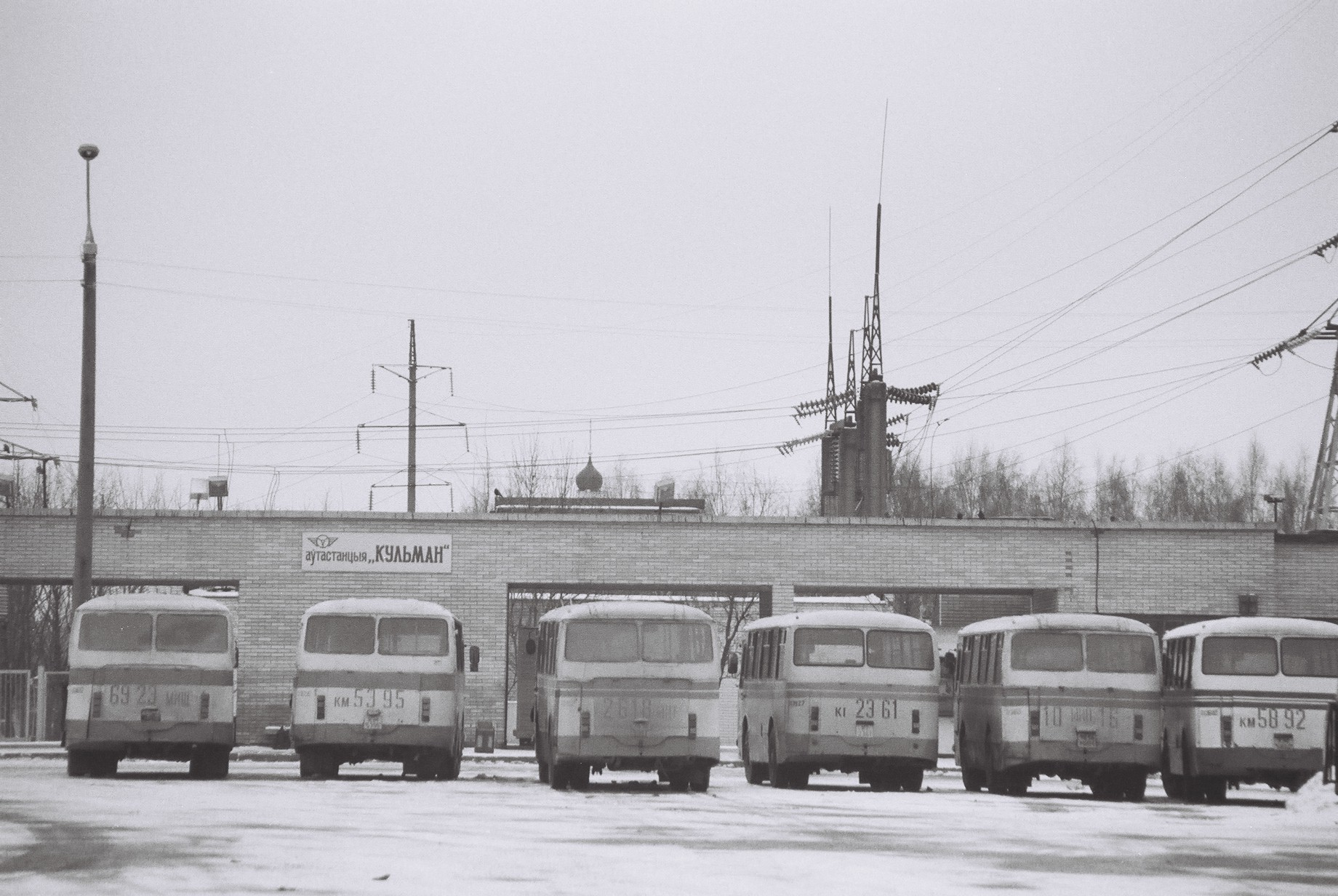
Six LAZ-695N at the bus station in Minsk, 2002. In Belarus, the last LAZ-695 was decommissioned in 2007

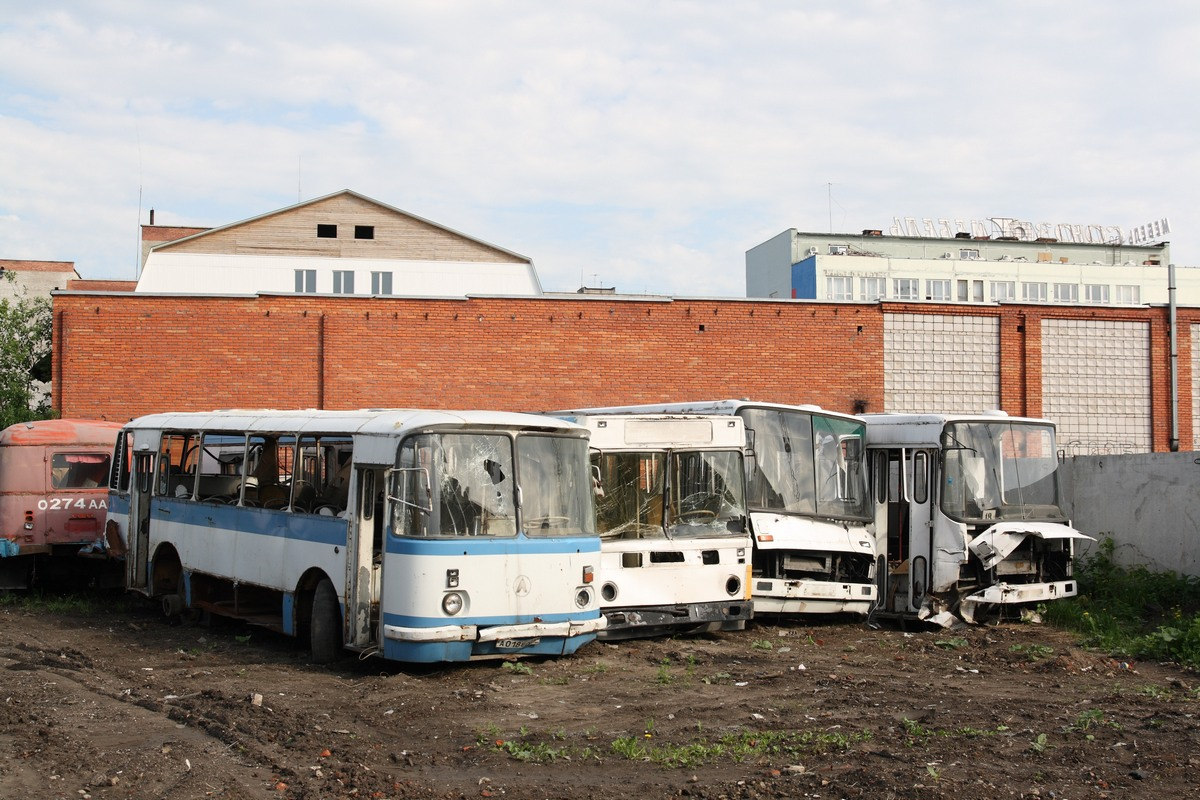
Decommissioned LAZ-695N at a state truck company in Saint Petersburg

== Engine data ==
There were used a lot of engine models in different modifications. Due to lack of sources with data, the table beneath includes only the most widely used models, with significant sources.

Technical data of the engines used in the LAZ-695 series
	ZIL-124/ZIL-158L (LAZ-695)	ZIL-130L (LAZ-695E/M)	ZIL-130Ya2N (LAZ-695N/NG)	MMZ-D245.9 (LAZ-695D)	YAMZ-236A (LAZ-695D11)
Type	gasoline powered, I6	gasoline powered, V8	gasoline powered, V8	diesel powered, I4, with turbo-charging	diesel powered, V6, with turbocharging
Number of cylinders	6	8	8	4	6
Displacement of cylinders (L)	5,55	6	6	4,75	11,15
Maximum power (hp (kW))	109 (81)	150 (110.4)	150 (110.4)	136 (100)	193 (142)
Maximum rotation speed of crankshaft at maximum power ( rpm)	2800	3200	3200	2400	2100
Maximum torque (Nm)	334	402	402	460	667
Maximum rotation speed of crankshaft at maximum torque [rpm]	1100-1400	1800-2000	1800-2000	1300	1200-1500
Weight of engine without fluids, with clutch and transmission kg	555	440	470	565	990

== Comparison to similar soviet city buses ==
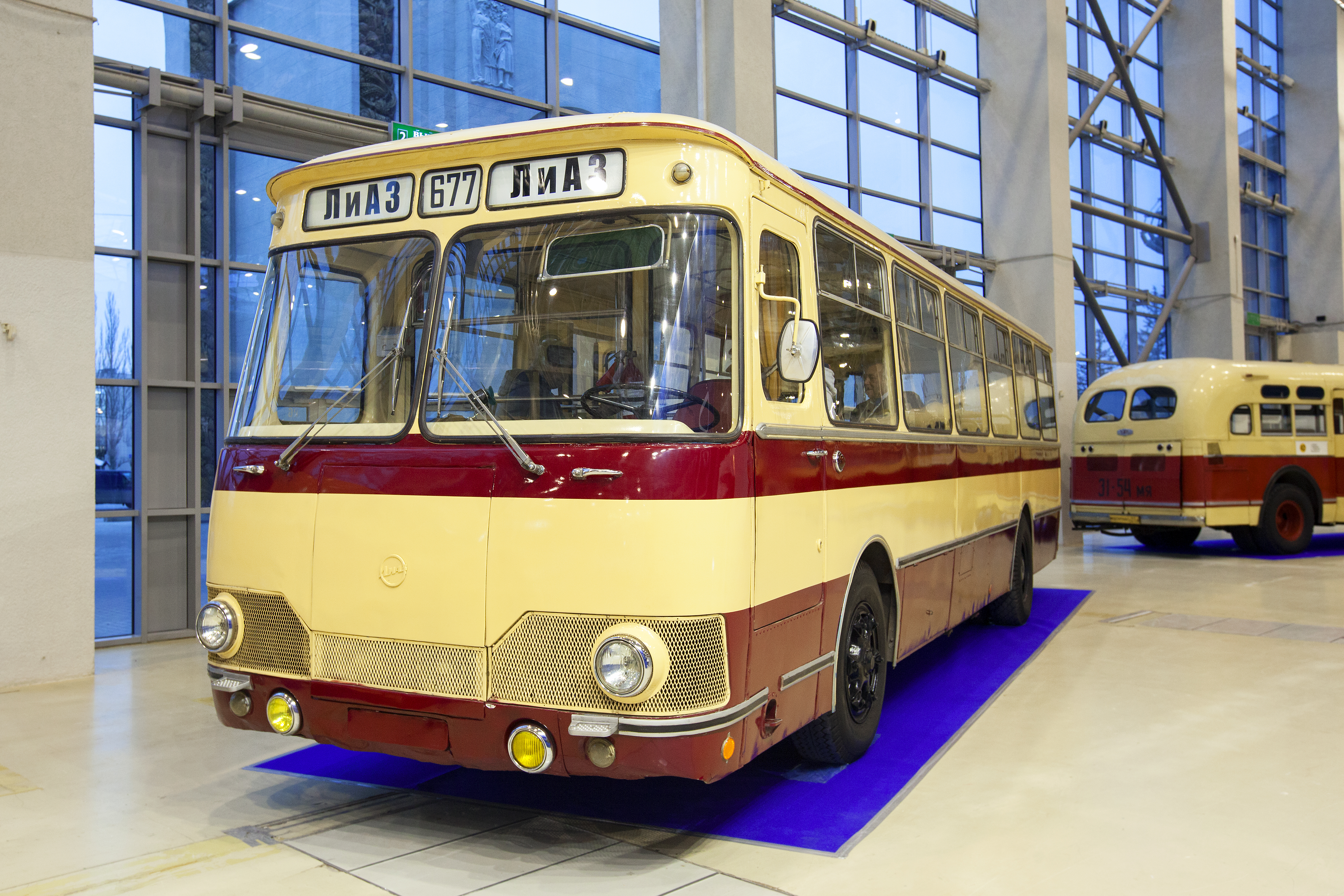
LiAZ-677

The main counterpart of the LAZ-695 in the Soviet Union was the LiAZ-677. The differences are a manual gearbox in the LAZ, whereas the LiAZ was equipped with a modern hydromechanical, automatically shifting gearbox, which was more practical to use in the city range and was also partially created at the LAZ plant. Furthermore, the LiAZ had a more comfortable pneumatic suspension. Hence, with the time the LAZ-695 was replaced by the LiAZ on urban bus routes of the bigger soviet cities. Nevertheless, the LAZ-695 had also some advantages. It had a bigger clearance and a robust leaf spring suspension. Also, the greater part of the load was taken up by the rear axle of the LAZ. So it was more suitable for rural areas.

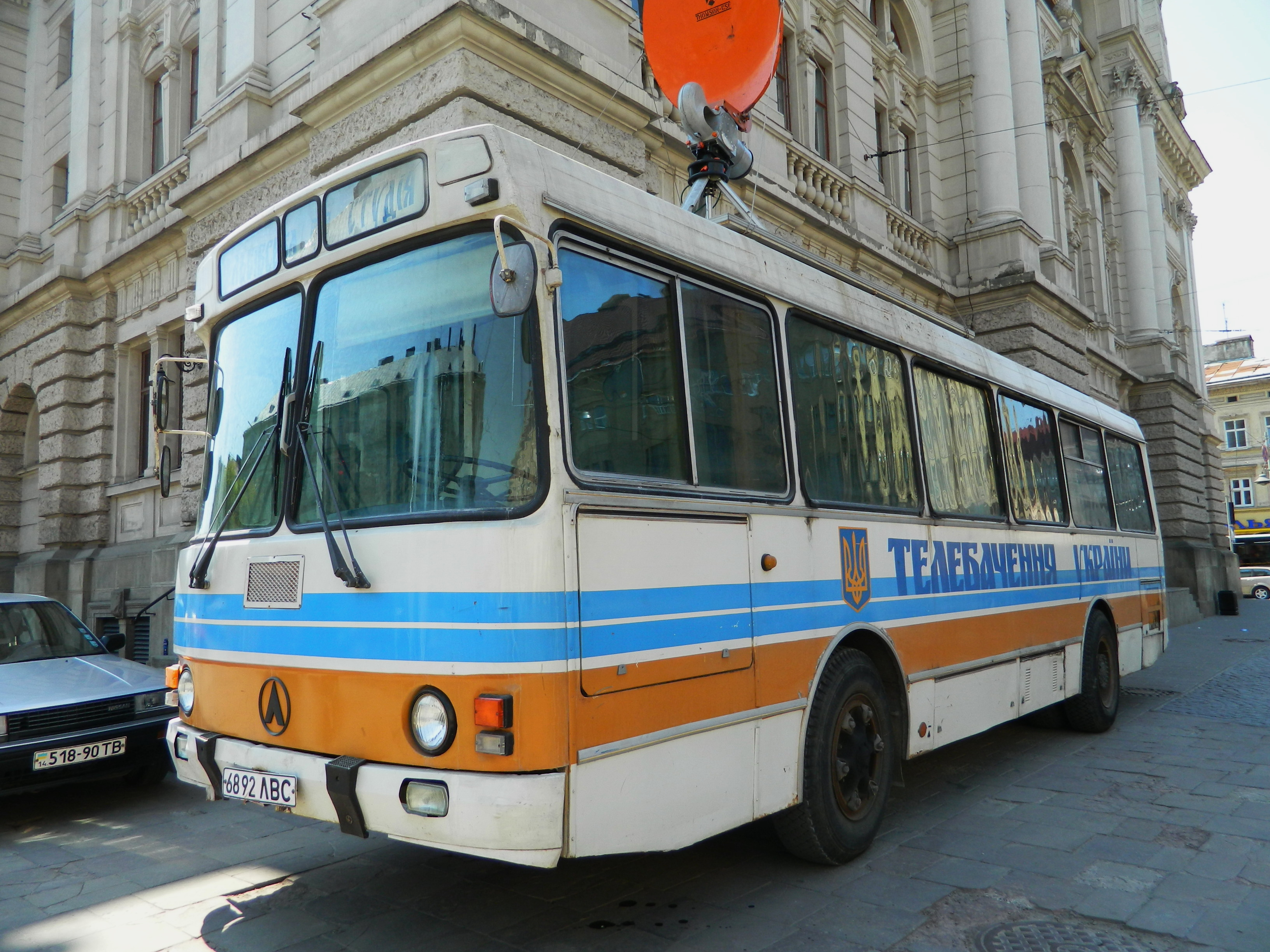
LAZ-4202

Another counterpart was developed and produced by the same manufacturer. The LAZ-4202 was still created in the 70s, in the Soviet Union and was intended as a possible successor of the technical obsolete 695 series. The bus got a diesel engine, made the model the first diesel-powered serial bus in the Soviet Union, after ZiL-127. Moreover, 4202 was the first serial model from the LAZ factory, with an automatically shifting gearbox and power steering. Compare to 695, the inner space was more lightly and had more free room for the passenger. However, in practice, the 695 survive the 4202 series by 15 years. The reasons were the poor quality of the construction and frequent defects of the technical aggregates.

Further similar city and suburban buses

- Ikarus 280
- Ikarus 260
- ZiS-155
- ZiL-158
