= Front axle assembly =

Section of a wagon

Front axle assembly is a type of axle construction for traditional carts with four or more wheels.

== History ==
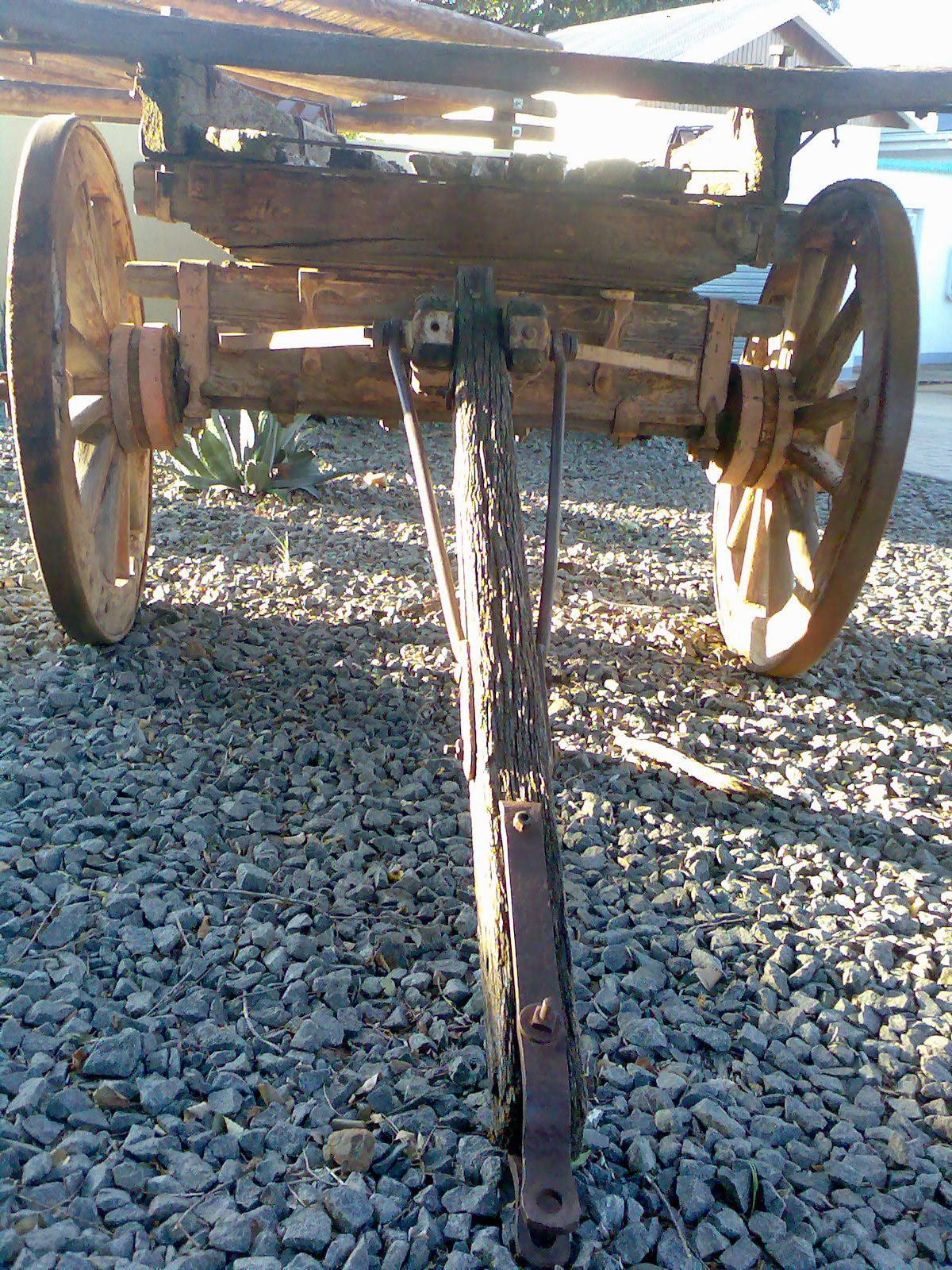
Front axle of an ox-cart.

Turning radius was a longstanding problem with wagons, dictated by the distance between the front wagon wheels and the bed of the wagon—namely, the point where the rotating wheels collide with the side of the wagon when turning. Many earlier designs required a very large turning radius; however, shrinking the width of the bed means decreasing the size of the load. As this is a problem that carts (by virtue of their two-wheeled nature) do not face, this factor, combined with their lighter weight, meant that carts were long preferred over wagons for many uses.

The general solutions to this problem involved several modifications to the front-axle assembly. The front axle assembly of a wagon consists of an axle, a pair of wheels and a round plate with a kingpin in its centre that sits halfway between the wheels, which may be mounted on spindles. A round plate with a hole in its centre is located on the underside of the wagon. The plate on the wagon, in turn, sits on the plate on the axle between the wheels. This arrangement allows the axle and wheels to turn horizontally. The pin and hole arrangement could be reversed. The horse harness is attached to this assembly. To enable the wagon to turn in as little space as possible, the front pair of wheels are often made smaller than the rear pair to allow them to turn close under the vehicle sides, and to allow them to turn still further, the wagon body may be waisted. This technique eventually led to further designs well-adapted to narrow areas; the front wheels of express wagons, trolleys and floats are small enough to turn under the vehicle's body.

== See also ==
- Ackermann steering geometry
- Beam axle
- List of auto parts
