= Rod end bearing =

Mechanical articulating joint

Male threaded heim joint (A) Casing (B) Ball swivel (C) Opening for attaching hardware (D) Threaded shaft

A rod end bearing, also known as a heim joint (North America) or rose joint (UK and elsewhere), is a mechanical articulating joint. Such joints are used on the ends of control rods, steering links, tie rods, or anywhere a precision articulating joint is required, and where a clevis end (which requires perfect alignment between the components) is unsuitable. A ball swivel with an opening through which a bolt or other attaching hardware may pass is pressed into a circular casing with a threaded shaft attached. The threaded portion may be either male or female. The heim joint's advantage is that the ball insert permits the rod or bolt passing through it to be misaligned to a limited degree. A link terminated in two heim joints permits misalignment of their attached shafts.

A linkage with heim joints on both of its ends transmits force in one direction only: directly along its long axis. It cannot transmit forces in any other direction, or any moments. This makes these types of joints useful for statically determinate structures.

== History ==
Spherical joints for the ends of connecting rods and levers have their origins in the early 20th century; British inventor Albert Joseph Rath patented such a joint in 1917.

The rod end bearing's widespread use in aircraft dates from the Second World War, and is associated with Lewis R. Heim of the Heim Company of Fairfield, Connecticut. According to Heim's obituary, in 1941 the U.S. Army Air Forces Materiel Command asked him to duplicate a rod end bearing used in the Messerschmitt fighter; Heim designed a similar bearing that was reportedly easier to manufacture, more efficient, and made of less critical material. Heim filed a patent for a method of manufacturing rod end bearings in 1942, granted in 1945. Heim licensed Rose Bearings of Saxilby, England, to manufacture rod ends for British aircraft. The ubiquity of these manufacturers in their respective markets led to the terms heim joint and rose joint becoming synonymous with the product. After the patents ran out the common names stuck, although as of 2017, rosejoint remains a registered trademark of Minebea Mitsumi Inc., successor to Rose Bearings Ltd.

A popular account holds that the rod end was unknown in Britain until Air Ministry experts found one in the control system of a Messerschmitt shot down in 1940. The story is not supported by contemporary sources, and the earlier patent record shows that such joints were not a wartime invention. Originally used in aircraft, the rod end bearing may be found in cars, trucks, race cars, motorcycles, lawn tractors, boats, industrial machines, go-karts, radio-control helicopters, formula cars, and many more applications.

== Adjustability ==
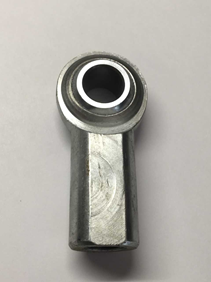
Female heim joint

Heim joints allow adjustability of the linkage length that they are attached to after assembly and installation. Rod ends are usually manufactured with slightly longer threads than are absolutely necessary, so they can be threaded further onto their mating shaft if needed. This is useful for maintenance, to correct for wear after a period of use, adjusting the link length to compensate for manufacturing tolerances, or fine tuning the performance of a mechanism after it is assembled. After adjustment, the new position is then locked in place with a jam nut.

== See also ==
- Ball joint
