= Upright Technologies =

Wearable device for correcting posture

Upright is a training wearable device worn on a person's upper or lower back to correct their posture. It is produced and distributed by Upright Technologies, an Israeli company. Upright was launched in 2015, following its development in Tel Aviv, Israel. The smart wearable device has been referred to as both a wearable and trainable tech.

The consumer device is designed to improve the wearer's posture by vibrating on the user's upper or lower back until they correct their posture. The device is paired with a free smartphone app for iOS or Android, so that the user can track the progress and receive a score each time the device is used. The recommended use varies from user to user, but typically should be worn between 5 minutes and an hour. Once the device has been used, it is suggested that it forms a new habit of good posture by building core strength and increasing one's awareness, so that good posture remains, even when the device isn't being used.

Upright has received positive reviews in TechCrunch, Inc. magazine, and Scientific American.

== History ==
Upright entered late testing in early 2015, before beginning to ship the device later that year. A Digital Trends article stated that the smart device would begin shipment in November 2015 for Upright customers who pre-ordered the item by October 20. The item launched with a 30-day money back guarantee, and is currently listed on the market for the price of $129.95.

During the early stages of development, Upright raised over $150k on Indiegogo.

In October 2015, the wearable tech company featured in Business Standard as one of the weeks listed Asian-based startups. The startup began in Tel Aviv, Israel, where the company is still based today.

== Technical ==
The smart device focuses predominantly on slouching in the lower back or upper back. Sticky pads are attached to the user's back and then the device is synchronized with a free smartphone application for iOS and Android. The smartphone is then used as the controller to calibrate and configure the smart device.

The retail box comes with 60 pads, with Inc. magazine stating in an interview that there should be enough pads for the buyer to see "significant improvements in posture." During Inc. magazine's testing of the device, the device was tested for both intentional and unintentional slouching in the lower back area, both of which the device responded well, according to the review.

Upright is a smart device that is not supposed to be worn all day, but for an amount each day in relation to one's personalized training programme to condition the muscles. These short periods of time wearing the device aim to train the muscles so that posture is changed even when the device is not being used. According to the developers at Upright, this strategy was taken so that the users don't become dependent on the device.

The normal training period begins at 5 minutes each day, which then gradually builds up to longer periods of use. The strategy is that if a person uses the device for a short period at the start, but on a regular basis, they are more likely to become accustomed to sitting with a good posture and build muscle memory for this position. The Cult of Mac review stated that when the user of the device slouched, the device sent a buzzing through the pads, so the user can then change their posture accordingly.
