= Ackermann steering geometry =

Arrangement of steering linkages

Ackermann geometry

The Ackermann steering geometry (also called Ackermann's steering trapezium) is a geometric arrangement of linkages in the steering of a car or other vehicle designed to solve the problem of wheels on the inside and outside of a turn needing to trace out circles of different radii.

It was invented by the German carriage builder Georg Lankensperger in Munich in 1816, then patented by his agent in England, Rudolph Ackermann (1764–1834) in 1818 for horse-drawn carriages. Erasmus Darwin may have a prior claim as the inventor dating from 1758. He devised his steering system because he was injured when a carriage tipped over.

== Advantages ==
The first requirement of any steering geometry is to avoid the need for tyres to slip sideways when following the path around a curve. The geometrical solution to this is for all wheels to have their axles arranged as radii of circles with a common centre point. As the rear wheels are fixed, this centre point must be on a line extended from the rear axle and where the axis of one front wheel meets that line, and the same with the other. A billy cart or four-wheel wagon, whose front axles are fixed to a solid beam with a central pivot, easily meets this condition but requires considerable steering effort because of the fore-and-aft movement of the wheels, and is heavily influenced by road surface variations.

Rather than the preceding "turntable" steering, Ackermann geometry gives each front wheel hub its own pivoted carrier (on solid axles this pivot is called a kingpin but on more complex suspension it may be separate upper and lower pivots), close to its hub. While more complex, this arrangement enhances controllability by reducing the fore-and-aft travel of the steered wheels. Optimally the kingpin is aligned so that its centre line, extended to the ground, co-incides with the centre of the road wheel where it touches the ground, thus mostly eliminating "bump steer" (where hitting a bump with one wheel causes the steering to move violently - a key problem on fast stagecoaches with turntable steering). The hub carriers have steering arms and the link between these is known as a tie rod or track rod which is moved from side to side to steer the vehicle. When the wheels are set straight ahead, the whole arrangement of the axle, steering arms and tie rod forms a trapezium(see picture). When the wheels are turned, the inner wheel turns farther than the outer wheel.

== Design and choice of geometry ==
Simple approximation for designing Ackermann geometry

A simple approximation to perfect Ackermann steering geometry may be generated by moving the steering arm pivot points inward so as to lie on a line drawn between the steering kingpins, which are the hub carrier pivot points, and the centre of the rear axle. The steering arm pivot points are joined by a rigid bar called the tie rod. With perfect Ackermann, at any angle of steering, the centre point of all of the circles traced by all wheels will lie at a common point.

Modern cars do not use pure Ackermann steering, partly because it ignores important dynamic and compliant effects, but the principle is sound for low-speed maneuvers. Some racing cars use reverse Ackermann geometry to compensate for the large difference in slip angle between the inner and outer front tires while cornering at high speed. The use of such geometry helps reduce tire temperatures during high-speed cornering but compromises performance in low-speed maneuvers.

== Extended Ackermann condition ==
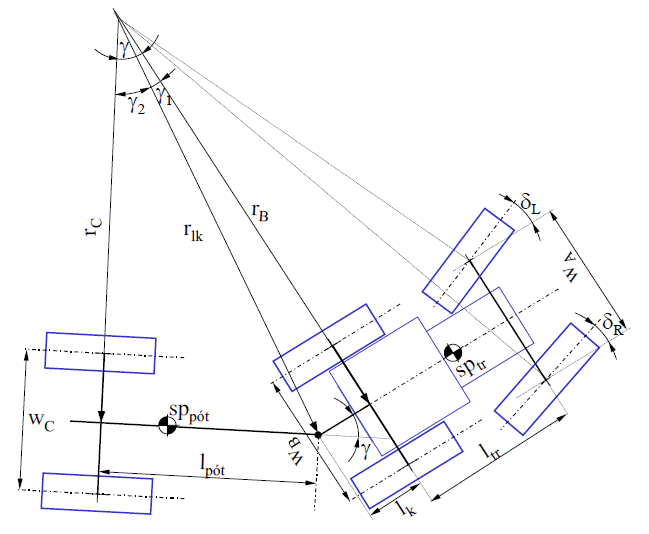
Extended Ackermann condition of vehicle and trailer

The Ackermann condition of vehicle train is fulfilled when both the vehicle wheel and the trailer wheel axes are pointing to the theoretical turning center (momentan centrum).

== See also ==
- Front axle assembly
- Differential steering
