= Spindle (automobile) =

Vehicle suspension component

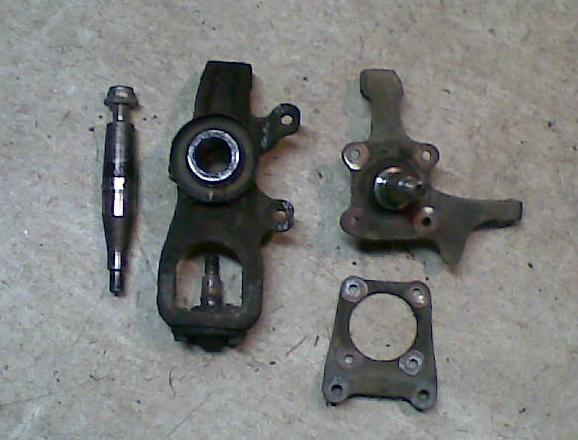
Spindles or uprights - Jaguar left and Holden Gemini right

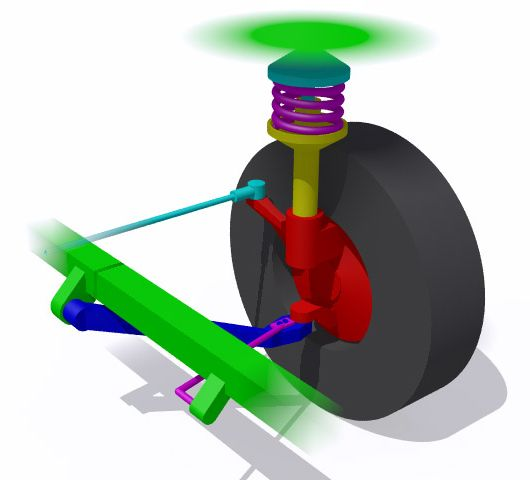
Automotive suspension, with the wheel spindle colored in red

In automobiles, a wheel spindle is the part of a suspension system that carries the hub for the wheel and attaches to the upper and lower control arms.

Spindles are carried by steering knuckles or "uprights". Although the terms "steering knuckle" and "upright" are sometimes used interchangeably with "spindle", they all refer to different parts.

== See also ==
- Front axle assembly
- List of auto parts
- Pintle
- Stub axle
