= Wheel hub assembly =

Automotive part

Common wheel hub assembly

A wheel hub assembly (WHA), also referred to as a hub assembly, wheel hub unit, or wheel hub bearing, is an automotive part used in most cars, passenger vehicles, and light and heavy trucks.

== Operation ==
The hub assembly is located between the brake drums or discs and the drive axle. A wheel is bolted on it. Depending on the construction, the end of the hub comes equipped with the splined teeth. They mate the teeth on the axle shaft. The axle hub spins along with the wheels bolted to it and provide power to the wheels in order to rotate.

A roller bearing between the axle hub and axle shaft ensures easy rotation of the non-drive wheels. On the axle side, it is mounted to the holding bracket from the chassis; on the disc side, the wheel is mounted to the bolts of the WHA. When replacing, a wheel hub assembly should be torqued to the vehicle's specifications to prevent failure.

== History ==
Wheel hub bearing are used at least since the 1930s when SKF designed a unit used on the Citroën Traction Avant car. As of 2019 at least 90 million vehicles use SKF wheel hub bearings.

== See also ==
- Locking hubs
