= LAZ-697 =

Soviet/Ukrainian two-axle urban/suburban bus

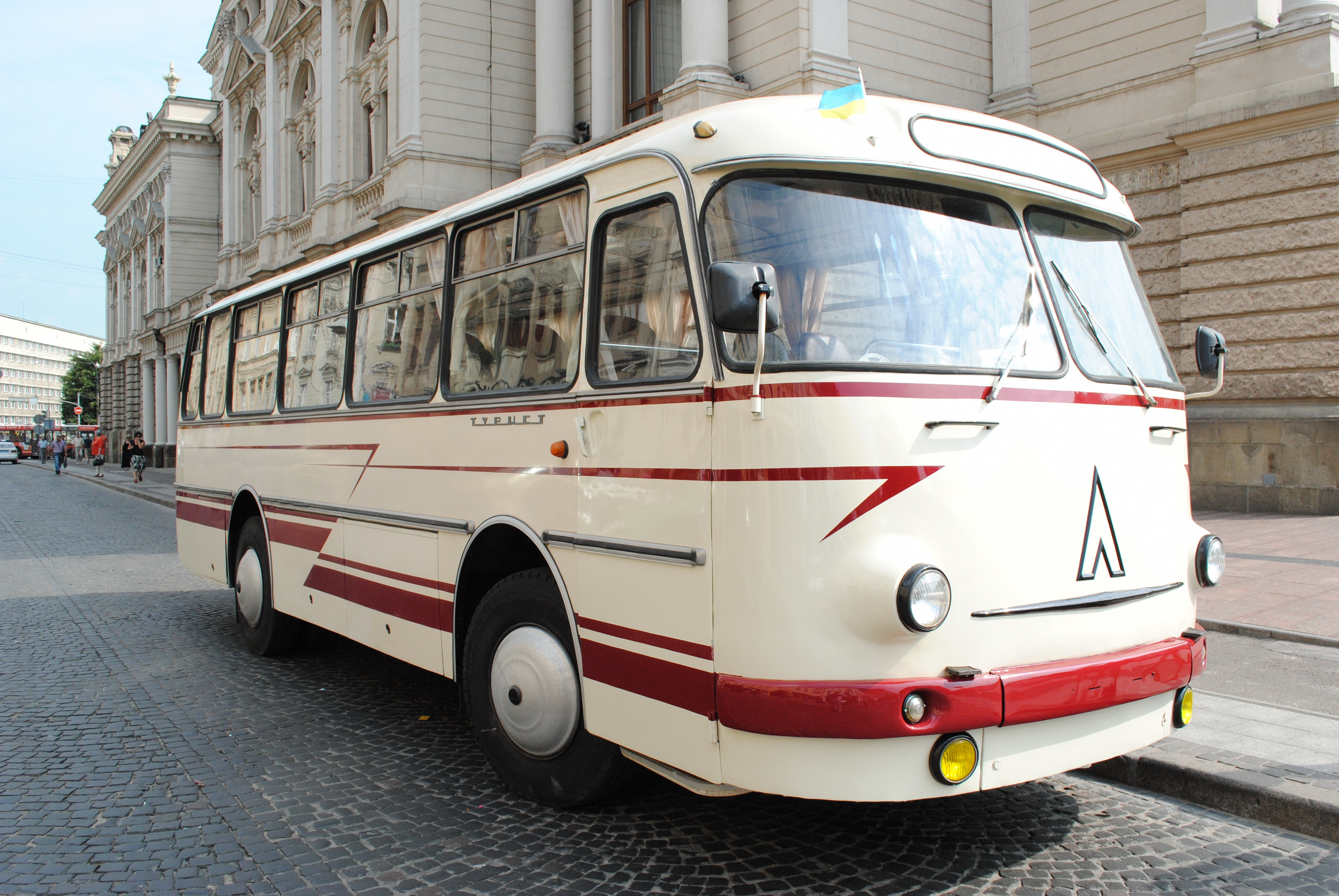
- LAZ-697M

Overview
- Type: Middle-class Coach, tourist bus
- Manufacturer: LAZ, Ukraine
- Production: 1959.-1985
- Model years: LAZ-697: 1959-1963; LAZ-697E: 1961-1969; LAZ-695M: 1969-1975; LAZ-697N: 1975-1978; LAZ-697R: 1978-1985
- Assembly: Lviv, Ukraine

Body and chassis
- Layout: Rear-engine, rear-wheel-drive layout
- Platform: 4x2 chassis
- Related: LAZ-695, LAZ-699

Powertrain
- Engine: LAZ-697/E: 5.5 L ZiL-158L V6 (gasoline), 109 hp; LAZ-697E/M/N/R: 6 L ZiL-130Ya2 V8 (gasoline), 150 hp
- Transmission: manual, 5-step transmission

Dimensions
- Wheelbase: LAZ-697/E: 4,130 mm (162.6 in) LAZ-697M/N/R: 4,190 mm (165.0 in)
- Length: LAZ-697/E: 9,220 mm (363.0 in) LAZ-697M/N/R: 9,190 mm (361.8 in)
- Width: LAZ-697/E: 2,500 mm (98.4 in) LAZ-697M: 2,370 mm (93.3 in) LAZ-697N/R: 2,500 mm (98.4 in)
- Height: LAZ-697/E: 3,050 mm (120.1 in) LAZ-697M: 2,950 mm (116.1 in) LAZ-697N/R: 3,000 mm (118.1 in)
- Curb weight: LAZ-697/E: 6,875 kg (15,157 lb) LAZ-697M: 7,300 kg (16,094 lb) LAZ-697N/R: 7,550 kg (16,645 lb)

The LAZ-697 “Tourist” was a Soviet two-axle, middle-class coach, which was produced in the Western Ukrainian city Lviv from 1959 to 1985. It was derived from the LAZ-695 during that model's development process. Because of that, both bus models are mechanically identical. The LAZ-697 was used for touristic purposes as well as for shorter intercity trips, being designed for greater comfort than the LAZ-695. It was taken out of production in 1985, in favor of the upper-class coach LAZ-699.

== History ==
External images
- Pictures of LAZ-695 prototypes, from which the LAZ-697 was derived
- Second Prototype
- Second prototype, inner space
- Fourth Prototype IV
- Entry door of the fourth prototype
- Seventh prototype
- Dashboard of the seventh prototype

During the early development stage of the urban bus model LAZ-695 seven different prototypes were created, four of which were the predecessors of the future 697-line. The first prototype had a lot of weaknesses, like a narrow inner space design and small entry doors. The developers did not try to solve these technical problems in the second prototype, which came out in summer 1956. Instead, they claimed them as a suburban bus and increased the comfortability. The rear entry door was removed and paired soften seats, based on spongy rubber and sheathed with semisynthetic textile, were installed. The next time the developers came back to the creation of a suburban bus, was the fourth prototype of the LAZ-695. It was technically identical to the second prototype. In the inner space the number of seats decreased from 34 to 32. Under the front entry door a step was installed, which extended when the door opened. To improve the problematical air supply of the engine, there was installed an air intake in the middle of the rear roof area. When in summer 1957 the serial production of the first LAZ-695 “Festival” begun, the constructors of LAZ continued to improve the suburban modification and created the sixth LAZ-695 prototype. The glass pane construction of the roof was strengthened and a one segment front window, instead of two-segment like in older prototypes, was installed. In the inner space a luggage net was installed over the seats. The front got a big L-letter, which stand for the city Lviv. This label will be a distinct feature of all LAZ-buses in the future. In the same year a seventh, more comfortable prototype came out of the LAZ plant. From now on, that modification was claimed as a coach for touristic purposes. The seats number increased to 34 and the front window became again a two-segment one. It was separated from the 695-line and developed further under the model designation 697.

== Modifications ==
Due to its unification with the LAZ-695, it was modified each time, the 695 got a new design or new components. Accordingly, there are as many main modifications of the LAZ-697 as of the LAZ-695, except the B-modification that not existed in the 697-line.

=== LAZ-697 (1959-1963) ===
In September 1958 the first prototype with the designation LAZ-697 was created by the LAZ constructors, in cooperation with the NAMI institute. The model got the nickname “Tourist”, which remained until the last modification. The inner space had 34 soft seats with integrated individual lights, ashtrays and little luggage grids, in which the passengers could store papers or journals. The roof had a sunroof with a soft top. A cooling system with a humidifier as well as an air heater and radio with a microphone were also installed in the bus. The luggage space, with a volume of 3,5 m^{3}, was under the floor and could be reached by lateral hoods on the right side. The prototype had two glass panes on the visor over the windscreen. The prototype was presented in Moscow and afterwards, a group of tourists from the LAZ factory used the bus for a tour to Czechoslovakia and Poland. In June 1959 a second prototype of the 697 line was developed. It had 33 passenger seats with tiltable backrests and horizontal adjustment. One seat next to the driver was intended for the guide and could rotate 180 degrees. The glass panes over the windscreen were removed and an air canal in the visor was installed that brought cool air into the inner space. The window leafs on the lateral glass panes were increased. Instead, the roof windows were downsized a little, to improve the stiffness of the bodywork. As engine, the ZIL-158L was used, a modification of the ZIL-164 truck engine, tailored to buses. The last prototype from November 1959 was similar to the serial model, whose production began one month later and lasted up to 1963.

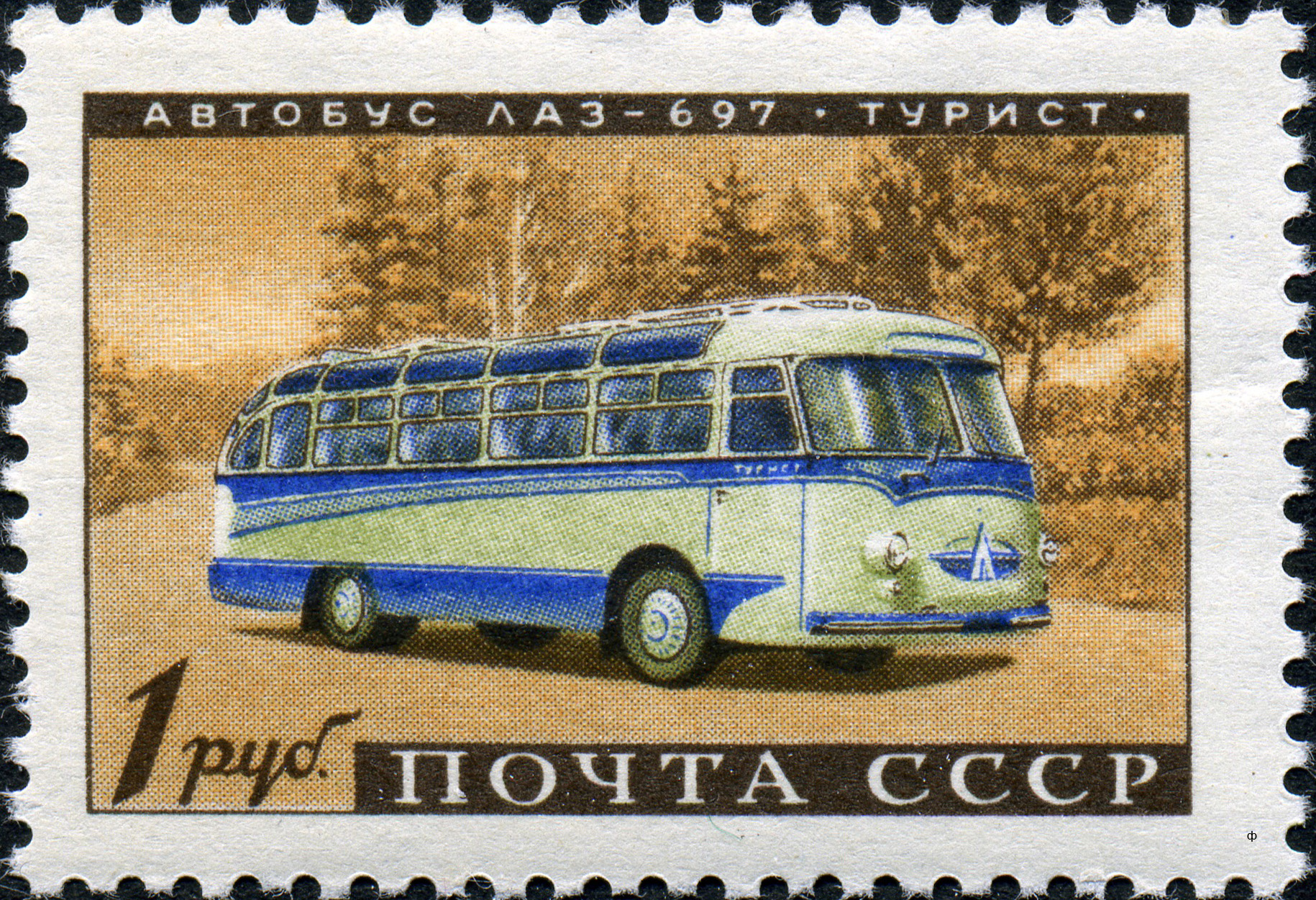
LAZ-697 “Tourist” on a soviet stamp from 1960

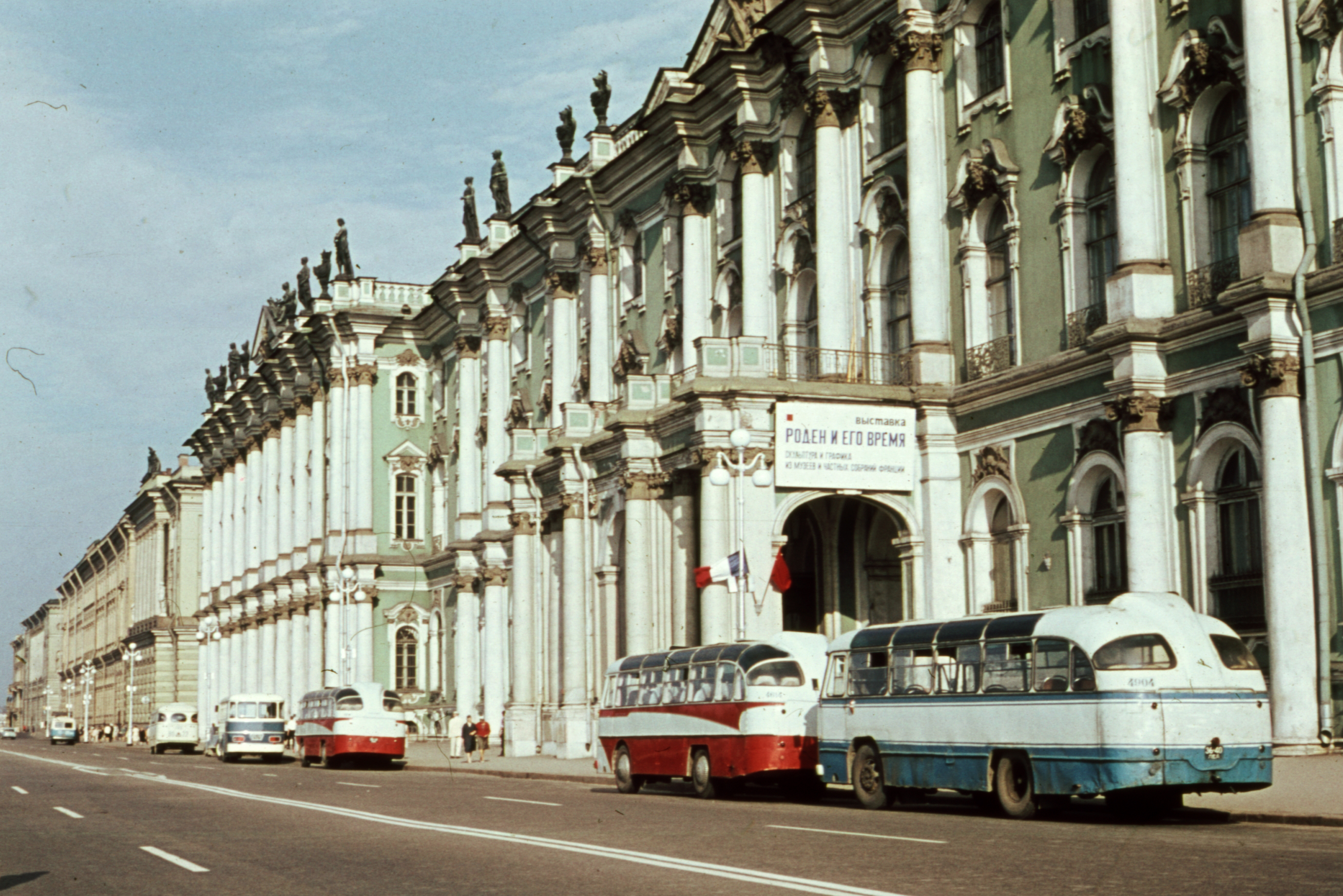
LAZ-697 (red), compare to LAZ-695E (blue) from rear, Saint Petersburg, 1968

=== LAZ-697E (1961-1969) ===
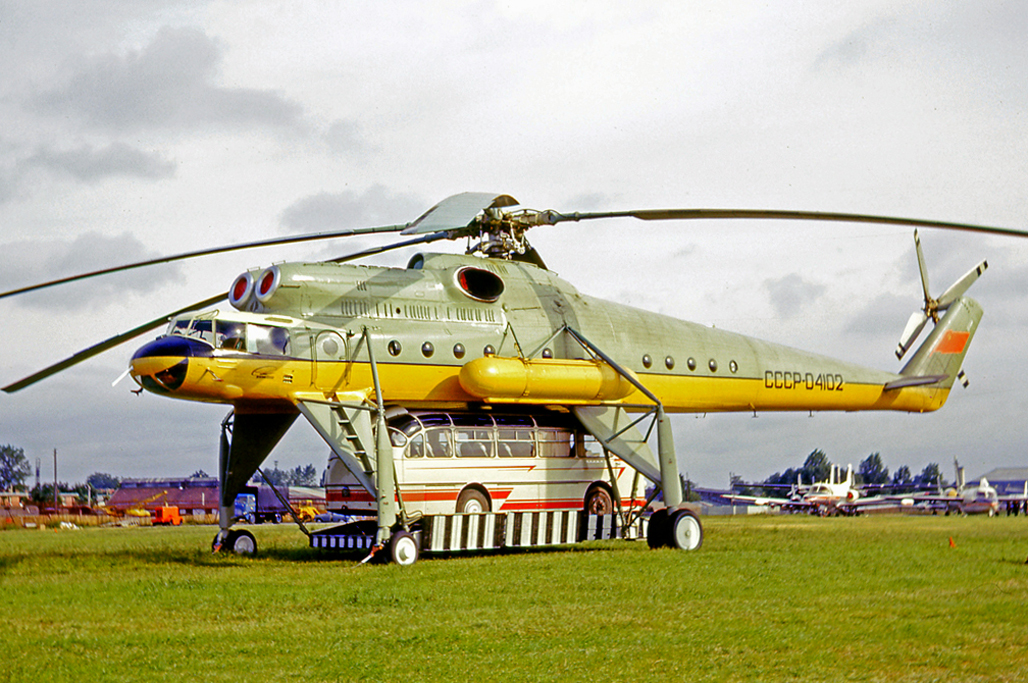
A LAZ-697E “Tourist” could be transported by the soviet military transport helicopter Mil Mi-10

External images
- Pictures of LAZ-697E
- LAZ-697E after the production stop of the LAZ-697
- Sunroof with a soft top

From 1960, episodical supplies with the new 150 hp engine, ZIL-130L, began. The buses that were equipped with these engines, became the new designation LAZ-695E. Only in 1963, when the engine supply began to be regular, the plant passed over completely to the new modification. Externally the first LAZ-697E did not differ from the LAZ-697. Only after the production stop of the first modification, the LAZ-697 became round wheel arches and the lateral mouldings disappeared.

=== LAZ-697M (1969-1975) ===
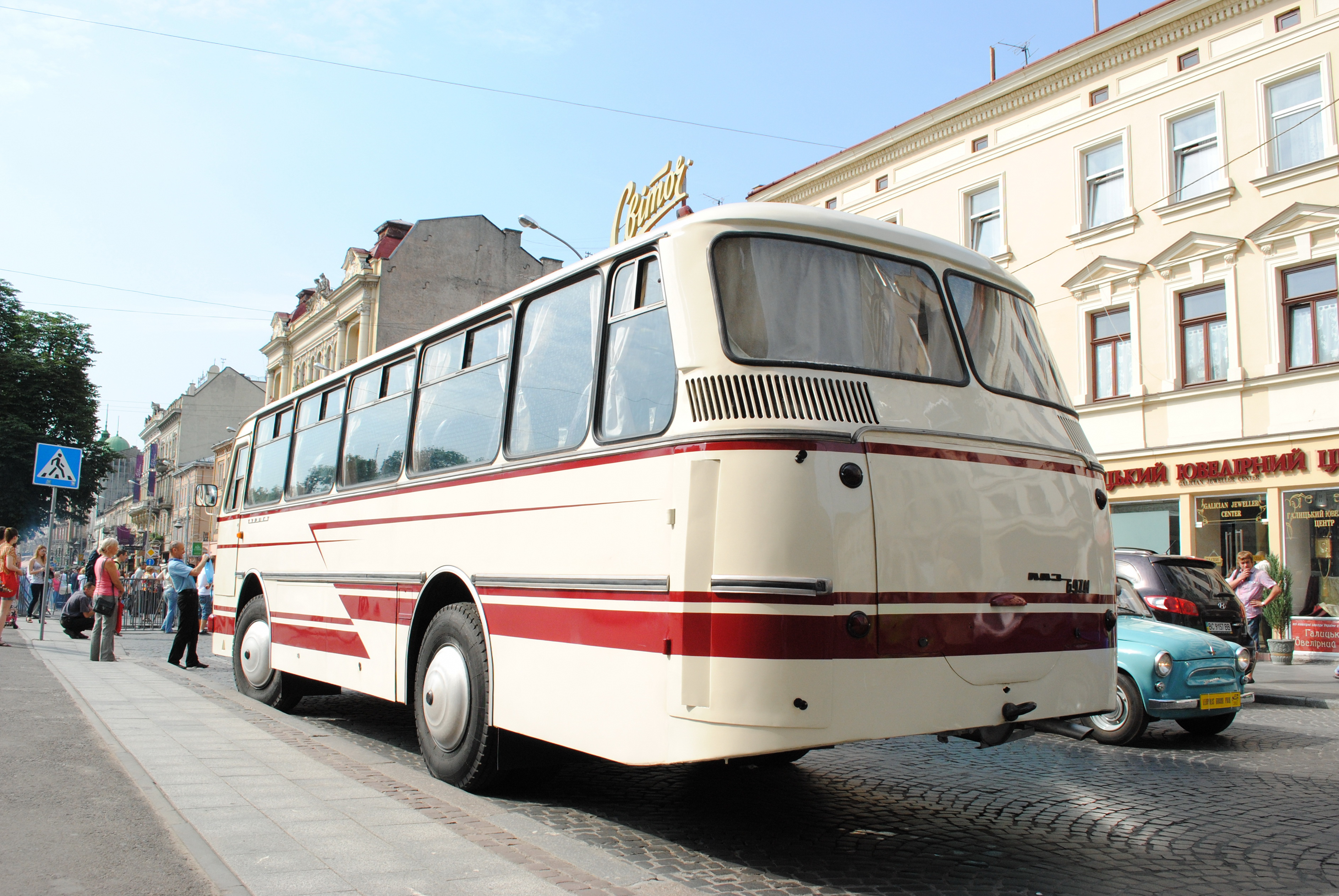
LAZ-697M, from rear

External image
- Pictures of LAZ-697M
- Transitional model of the LAZ-697M, with the back of the LAZ-697N

The LAZ-697M “Tourist” replaced the LAZ-697E in 1969E. The roof glass panes and the air intake pipe at the back of the roof disappeared. Instead, the lateral windows were increased. The engine air supply was carried out by deflectors beneath the rear window. The M-modification also got a rear axle from the Hungarian vehicle spare parts producer Raba, and power steering. The braking system effectiveness was increased. The first time, the new bus modification was shown to the public, was at a car show in Moscow, in 1969. At the end of the production, the bus got the rear body part of the new LAZ-695N. In 2005, the former and last owner of the LAZ factory, Igor Churkin, restored a LAZ-697M, which can be seen on the left picture. There are no other LAZ-697M left.

=== LAZ-697N (1975-1978) ===
External images
- Pictures of LAZ-697E
- The serial LAZ-697N, with round lights
- Transitional model of the LAZ-697N, with the back of the LAZ-697M and rectangular lights, 1971
- LAZ-697N, preserved to this days
- Transitional model of the LAZ-697N, similar to future LAZ-697R, but with a rear entry door

The first time the new LAZ-695N was presented to the public, was at the Exhibition of Achievements of National Economy, in Moscow, in 1971. An interesting fact is that the LAZ-697N was created later than the LAZ-695N and the LAZ-699N but was first introduced into serial production. The front of the bus changed completely. It got a bigger windscreen and became flatter. The air supply deflectors moved behind the last lateral windows. Firstly there were installed rectangular lights, which were produced in West Germany. Later they were replaced by the cheaper, round lights, which were typical for all soviet trucks and buses. The serial production did not last long. Already in 1978, the LAZ plant started to produce a transitional LAZ-697N, which in many ways was unified with the future LAZ-697R. It has no window leafs anymore but instead an air conditioning system, which was installed on the middle of the roof. A distinct feature that could be found only on that LAZ-697N, was the rear entry door, like on the upper-class coach LAZ-699N. But the additional door decreased the number of seats and in the subsequent modification, LAZ-697R, it was removed.

==== LAZ-697NT/NE ====
Similar to LAZ-695N, there existed two export versions of the LAZ-697N. The NE-modification was prepared for use in countries with Temperate climate and the LAZ-695NT for countries with humid as well as arid climate

=== LAZ-697R (1978-1985) ===
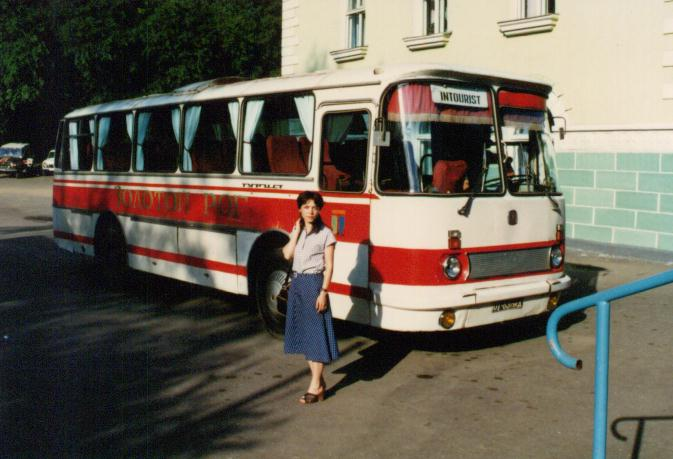
LAZ697R in Nakhodka,1985

LAZ-697R is a further modification of the LAZ-697N. As the last LAZ-697N, it has no window leafs and instead, an air conditioning system on the roof. The only external differences are the rectangular indicators that on the LAZ-697R are positioned over the driving lights. The production was stopped in 1985 and the capacities were used for the bigger coach, LAZ-699R.

=== Other modifications ===
In 1996, on the base of the LAZ-695N, a diesel version was created that was similar to the no longer produced LAZ-697. As engine, the Russian YAMZ-236A was used and the bus was designated as LAZ-695D11 “Tanya”. The bus had two entry doors, same as the last LAZ-697N models, and comfortable, soft seats. Also, in the 90s, some LAZ-695N were re-equipped with soft seats and manually opened one-section doors, like on the LAZ-697, by their owners themselves. They can be distinguished from the original LAZ-697 by the presence of a rear door.

External image
- Other modifications
- LAZ-695D11 “Tanya” that was similar to LAZ-697

Due to its early production end, there were no serial diesel modifications, like in the 695- or 699-line. But after the Dissolution of the Soviet Union and the rise of the fuel prices, a lot of bus owners re-equipped their LAZ-697 into diesel or gas-powered vehicles. There are not a lot of sources for that fact but some LAZ-697R, with a YAMZ-236A, were on sale on the internet.

== Technical data ==
=== Engines ===
The main engines that were installed on most LAZ-697, were the ZIL-158L and the ZIL-130Ya2. ZIL-158L was a special modification of the ZIL-164, a truck engine and tailored for buses, as the name suggests, firstly for the ZIL-158 city bus and then for the LAZ-695 and LAZ-697, respectively (The letter L stands for LAZ). The power was increased from 97 to 109 hp at 2800 rpm, thanks to a greater compression ratio of 6,2. The transmission on the ZIL-158L had a remote control because the LAZ buses had a rear engine. From the last LAZ-697E series, the engine was replaced with a new ZIL-130Ya2, with a power of 150 hp. The Ya2 modification had the same differences from the original ZIL-130 engine, as did the ZIL158L from the ZIL-158. It was built specifically for rear-engine buses.

Technical data of the main engines, installed on the LAZ-697
	ZIL-158L	ZIL-130Ya2
Type	carbureted, I6	carbureted, V8
Number of cylinders	6	8
Displacement of cylinders (l)	5,55	6
Maximum power (hp) ([kW])	109 (81)	150 (110.4)
Maximum rotation speed of crankshaft at maximum power (rpm)	2800	3200
Maximum torque (Nm)	334	402
Maximum rotation speed of crankshaft at maximum torque (rpm)	1300	1700
Weight of engine without fluids, clutch and transmission (kg)	420	455

=== Dimensions and other data ===
Dimensions and other data of the LAZ-697E/M/N/R
	LAZ-697E	LAZ-697M	LAZ-697N/R
Number of seats	33	33	33
Maximum turning radius of the external front wheel (m)	8,5	8,5	8,5
Empty weight (kg)	6875	7300	7550
Permissible load (kg)	9613	10575	10880
Permissible load on the front / rear axle (kg)	3700 / 5913	3700 / 6875	3770 / 7110
Maximum speed (km/h)	87	87	85
Fuel consumption (l/100 km)	35	35	35
Brake type	pneumatic	pneumatic	pneumatic
Braking distance at 30 km per hour (m)	13	18	16
