= Lviv Bus Factory =

Bus manufacturing company in Lviv, Ukraine (1945-2014)

Lviv Bus Factory (LAZ)

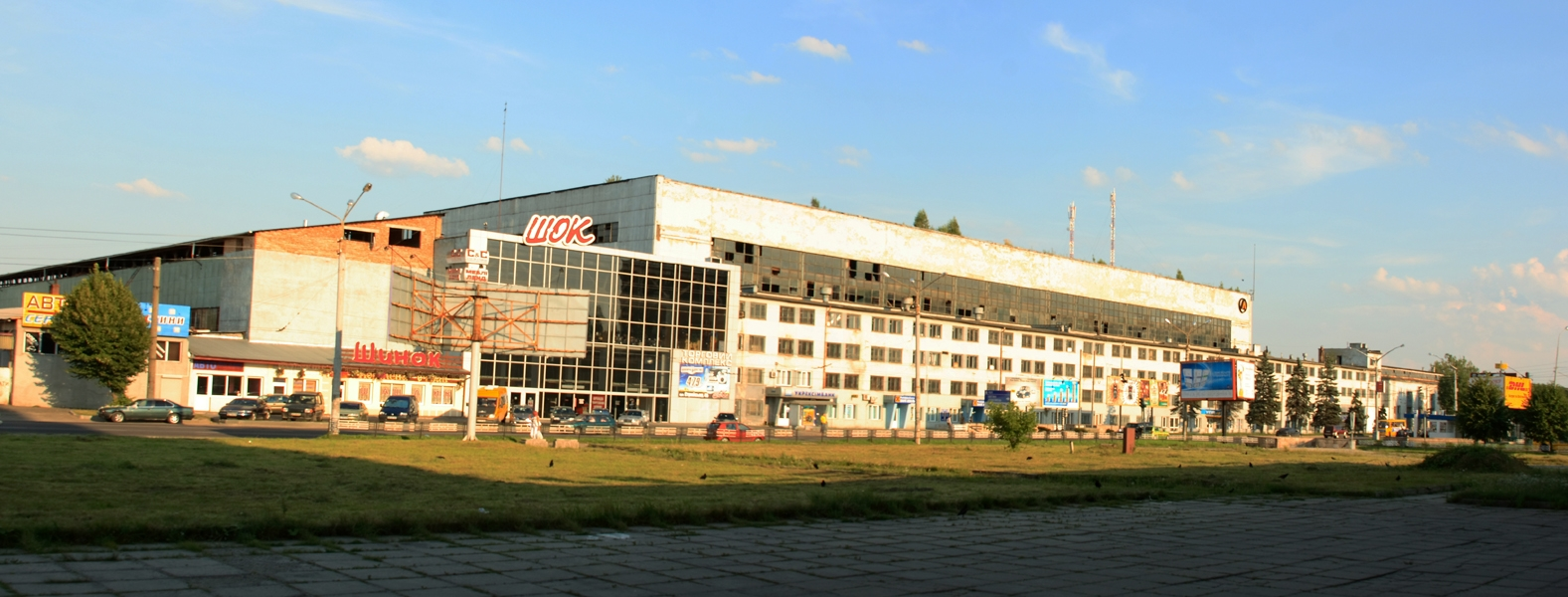
- LAZ factory in Lviv
- Company type: Holding company
- Industry: Bus manufacturing
- Founded: May 21, 1945; 81 years ago in Lviv, Ukraine
- Defunct: October 2014
- Headquarters: Kyiv Ukraine, Lviv, Ukraine
- Key people: Igor Churkin
- Products: Buses, trolleybuses
- Brands: LAZ, Lemberg Coach, LVIV bus
- Owner: City Transport Group
- Parent: LAZ Holding
- Website: www.laz.ua

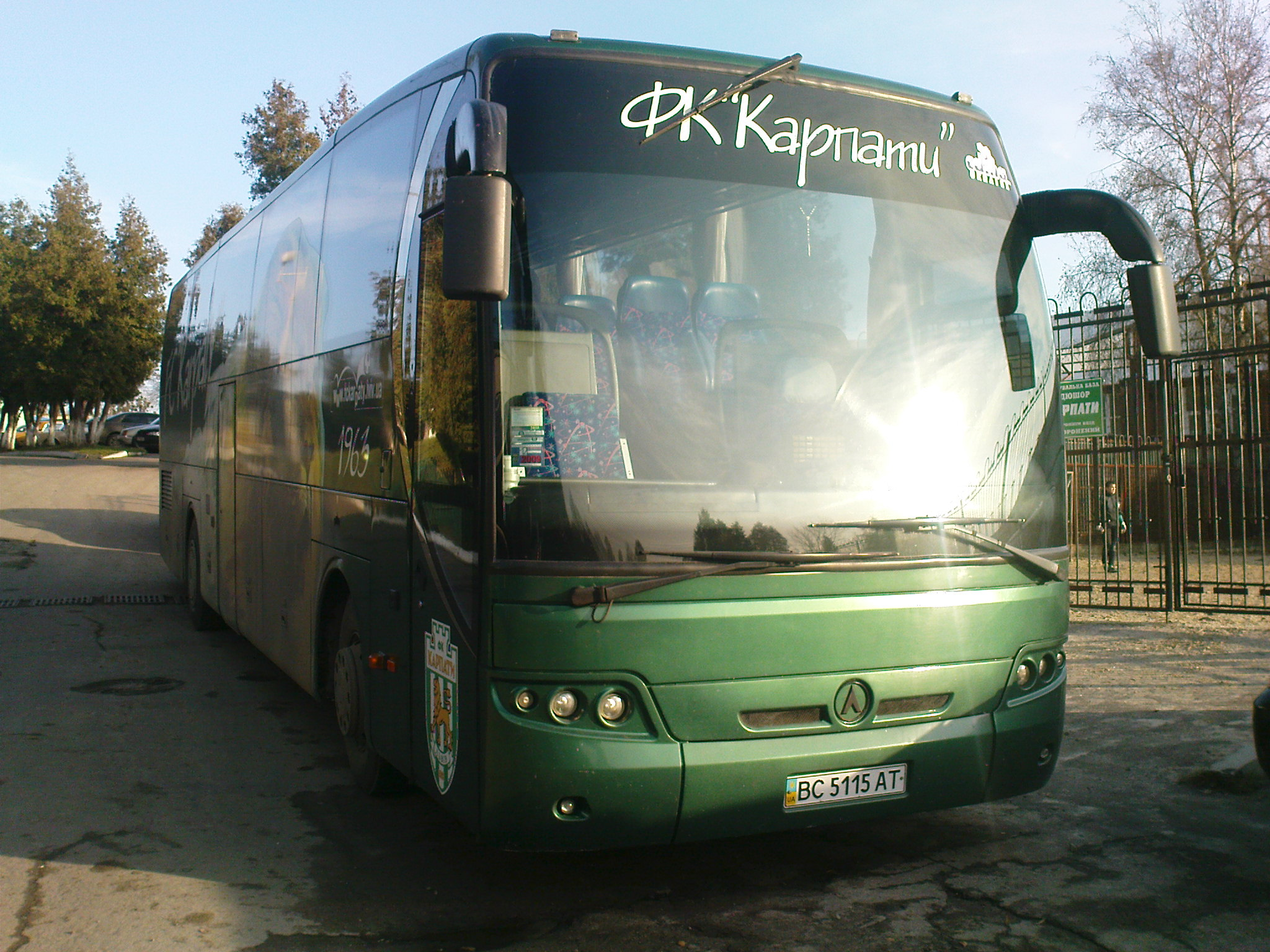
NeoLAZ 12 is used by FC Karpaty Lviv.

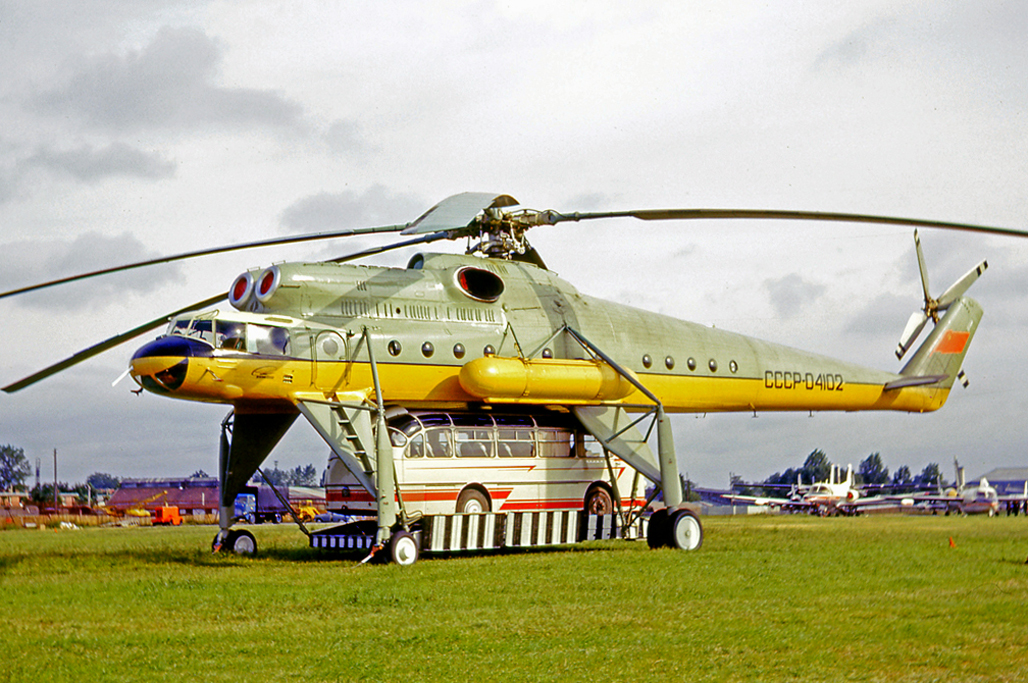
A Mil Mi-10 transport-helicopter displayed at the 1965 Paris Air Show with a LAZ bus carried beneath it.

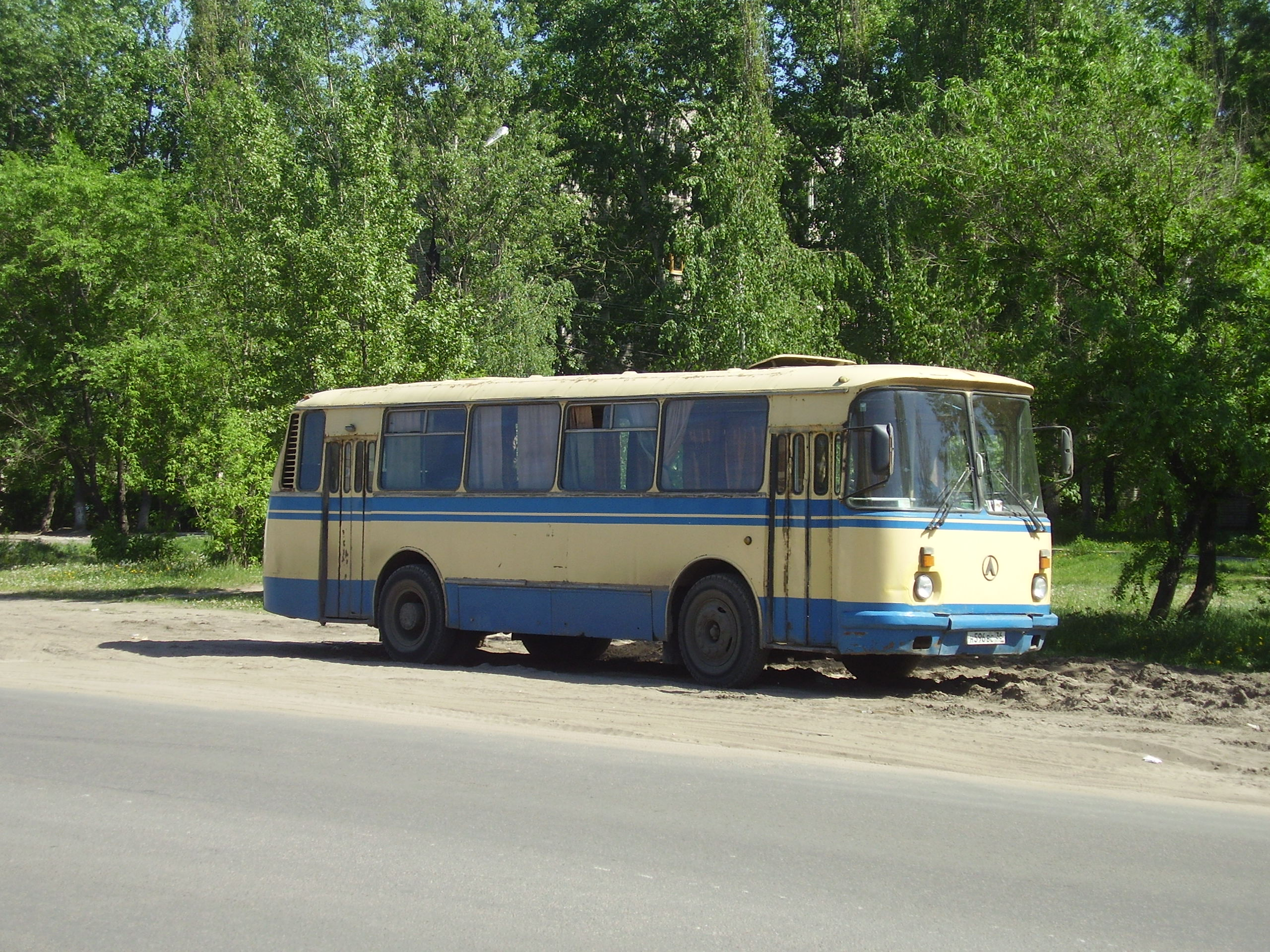
LAZ 695 — a common sight in former Soviet cities

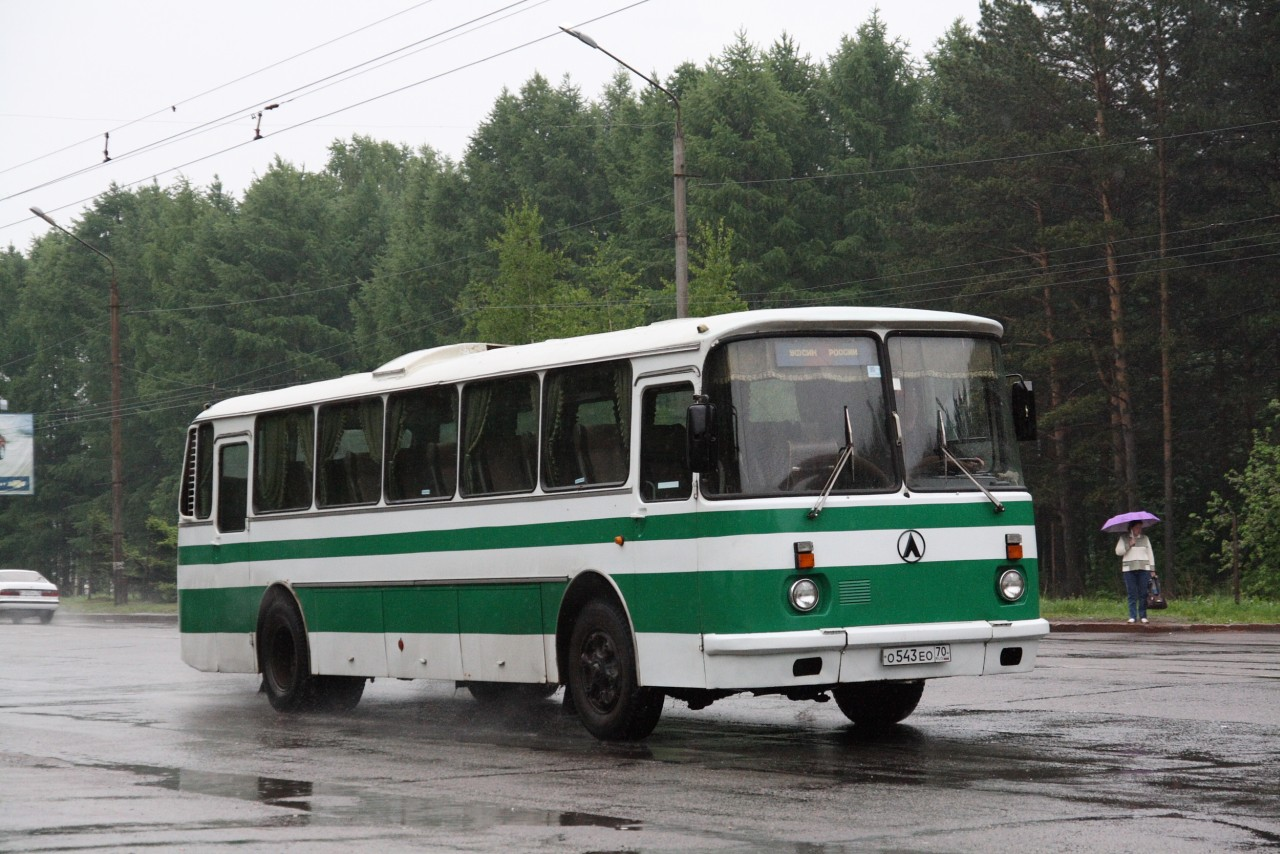
LAZ 699 in Tomsk, Russia

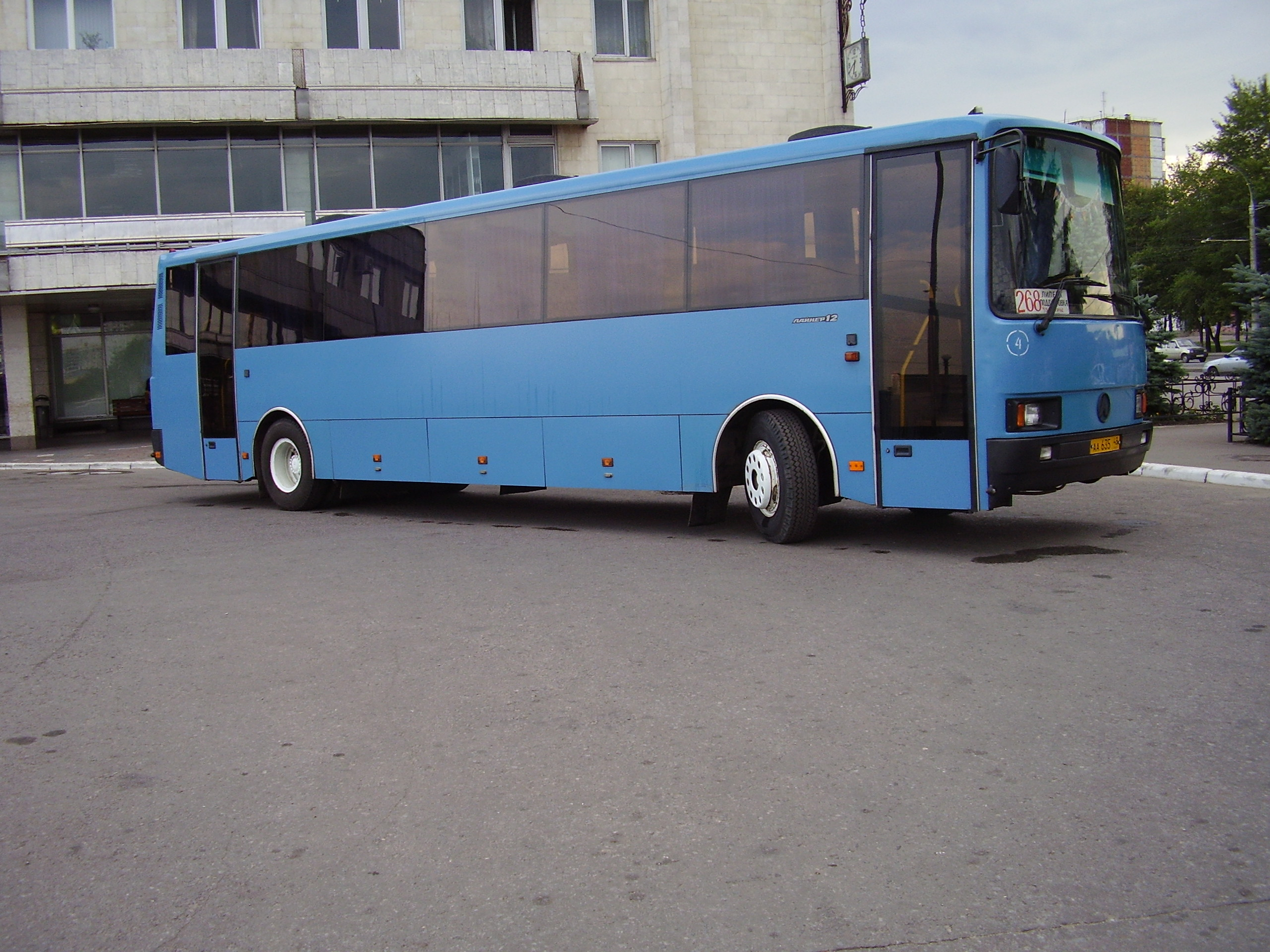
LAZ Liner 12

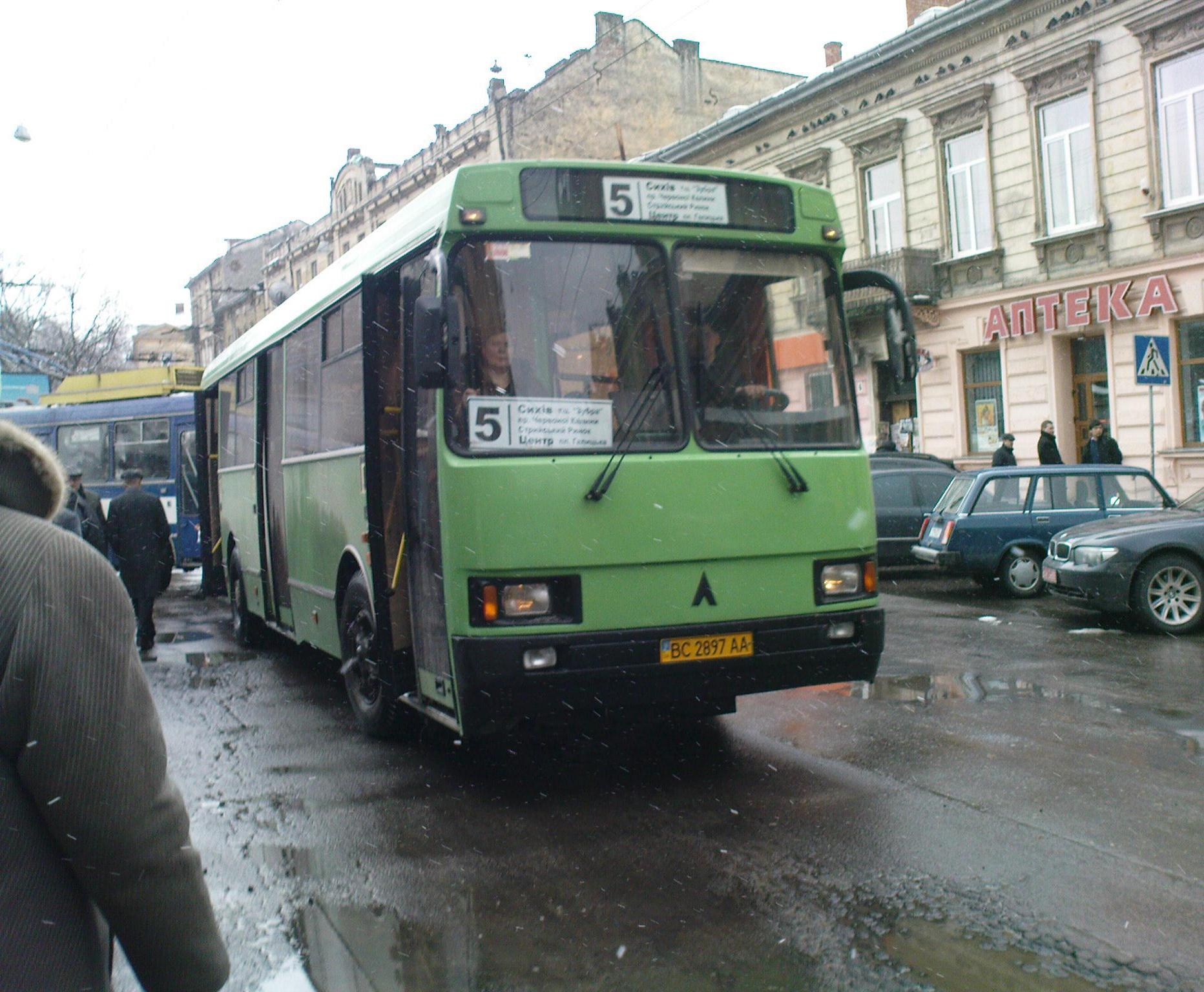
LAZ 52528 in Lviv

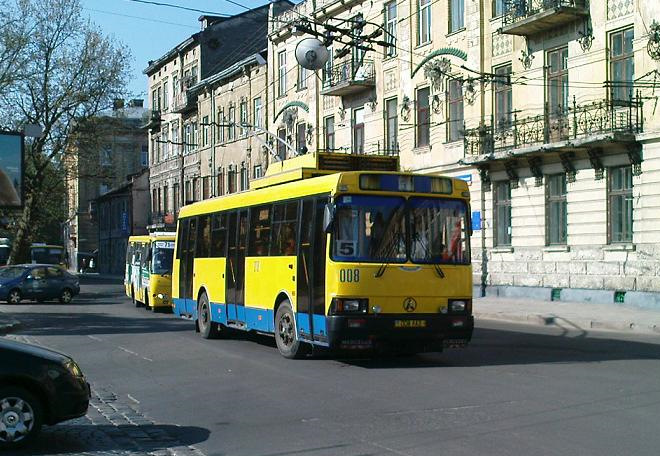
LAZ 52522 trolleybus

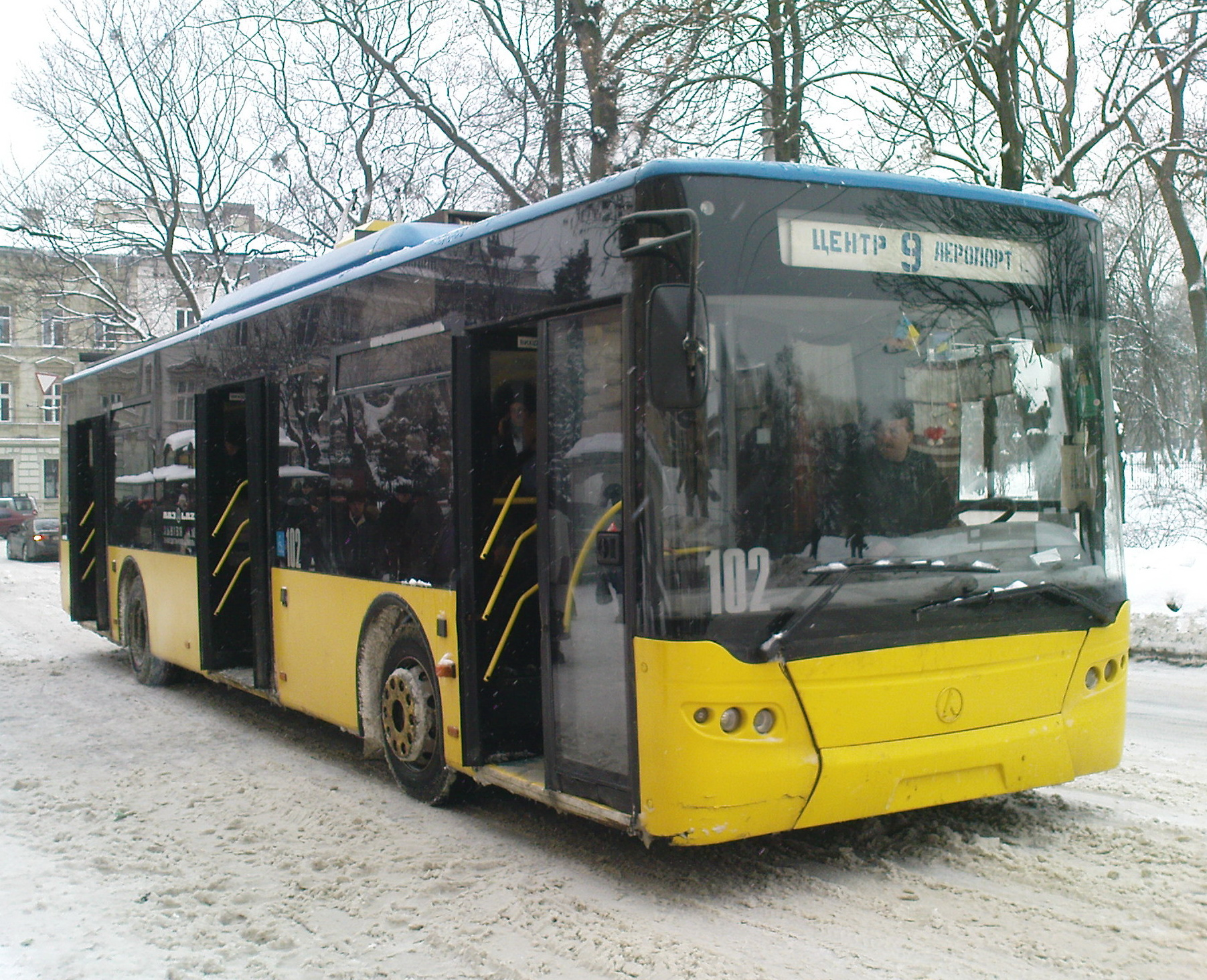
ElectroLAZ 12

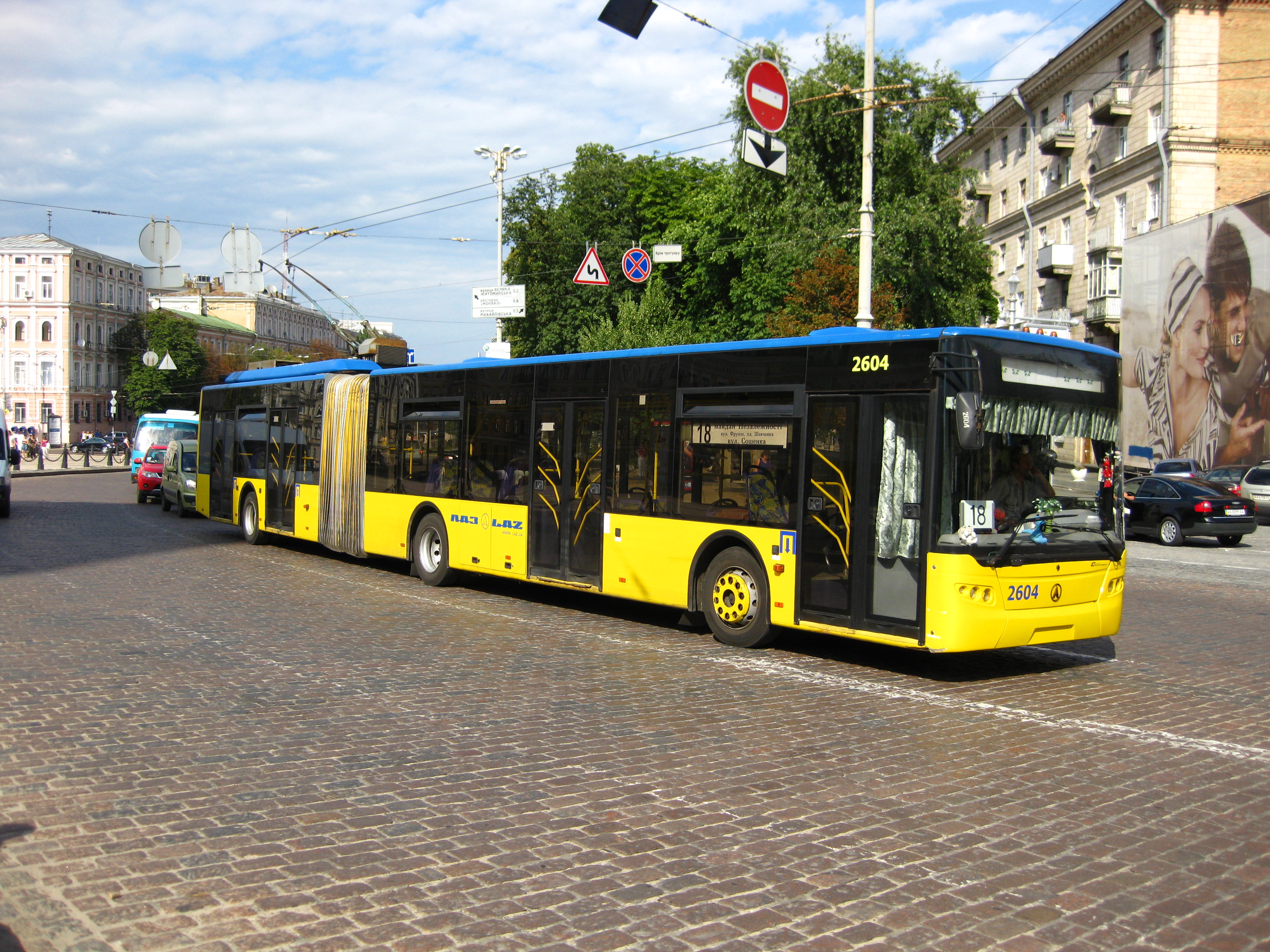
ElectroLAZ E301D1 - 18.6 meter trolley bus

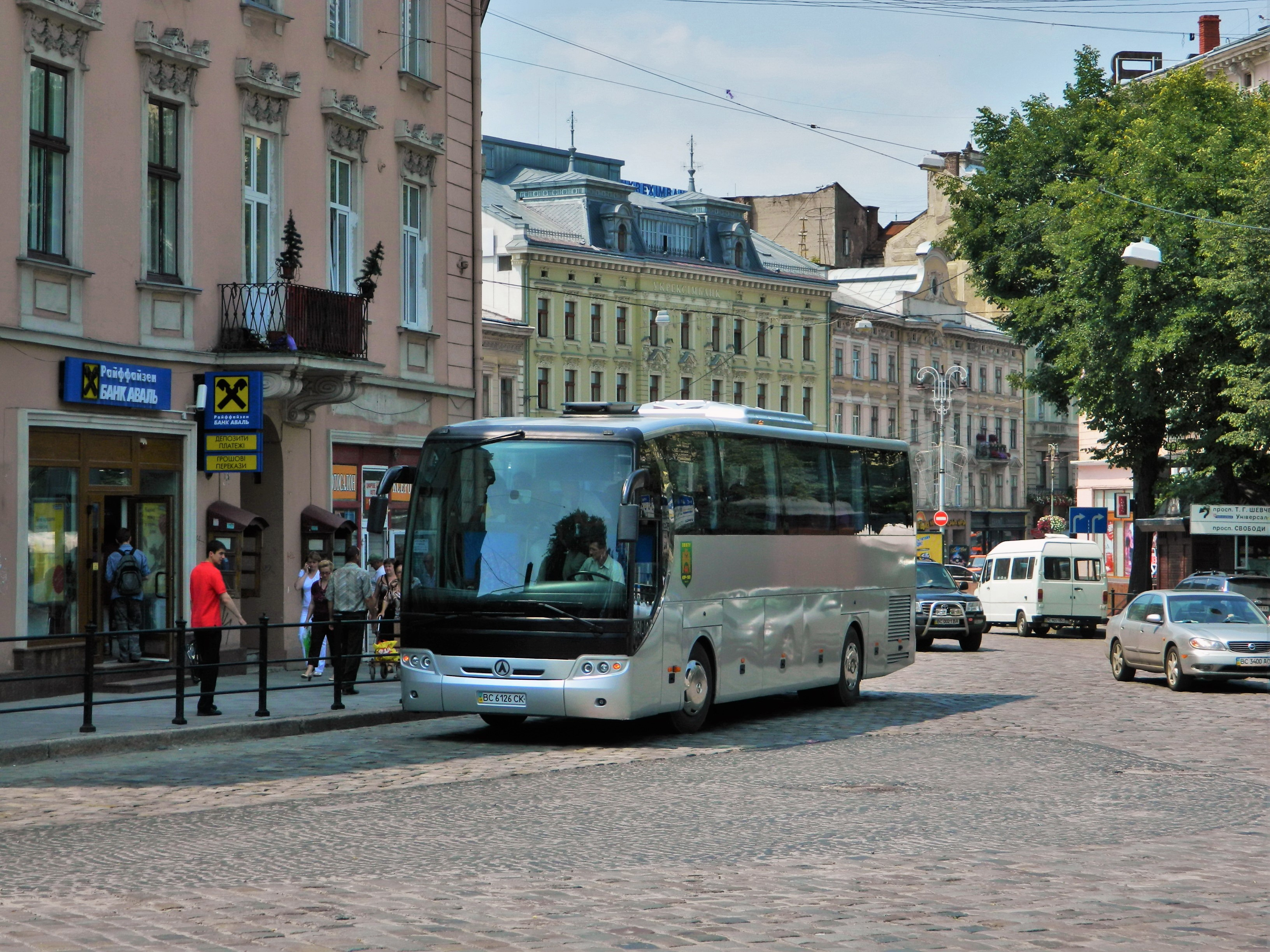
Lemberg 5208 in the center of Lviv

The Lviv Automobile Factory (Ukrainian: Львівський автомобільний завод), mostly known under its obsolete name Lvivskyi Avtobusnyi Zavod (Ukrainian: Львівський автобусний завод, literally "Lviv Bus Factory") was a bus manufacturing company in Lviv, Ukraine. Their brand-name is LAZ (ЛАЗ), and the company and its products are often referred to with this acronym rather than the full name.

It was one of the major bus manufacturers in the Soviet Union and the largest-ever industrial company in the city of Lviv. The factory was held by a private holding company.

== History ==
The Lviv Bus Plant LAZ was built in 1945 to produce ZIS buses for the USSR. The LAZ 695 bus was designed and approved by the Moscow Ministry of Transport. Production began in 1956 and continued until 2006.

During the 1970s many new models were developed such as the LAZ 699, and 697 both of which are coach buses. In 1967, LAZ was awarded the best bus producer in Europe at the Brussels Auto Show. LAZ is known to be the first company to create the low floor bus, which came in 1963, was called the LAZ 360, and was designed by Nami USSR.

After the Soviet Union collapsed in 1991, LAZ suffered economic issues due to the loss of funding. Production was halted due to low demand. After Ukraine's economy started to stabilize, LAZ began producing their newer model, the LAZ 52523.

In 2001, LAZ was sold to Russian business tycoon Igor Churkin, and a new business model was implemented. The whole line of production was re-engineered to produce new buses for a lower cost. LAZ used a system called a "flexible assembly line", which gave the ability to produce a variety of different models simultaneously. Additionally, LAZ buses were hand assembled.

Some of their most widely known products included the LAZ-695 city bus and its stretch, tourist-oriented version, the LAZ-699. ElectroLAZ, the LAZ trolleybus, was used by over 25 cities around the world.

LAZ provided transportation for the UEFA Euro 2012 championship held in Ukraine and Poland in 2012. The Ukrainian government signed a contract to purchase 2500 new "CityLAZ", with a possibility of 800 more. After the championship, LAZ buses were used as regular city transportation in the cities hosting EURO 2012. In 2012, three new models were introduced: The LAZ 695 Soyuz, the LAZ 4207 DM, and the LAZ A183 CNG.

The factory stopped its operations in October 2014, with a few thousands of its employees losing their jobs. According to materials of a criminal investigation, starting from 2005 Churkin, as head of the company's supervisory board, had used forged documents to transfer the factory's property into his personal ownership, which caused significant financial losses. In 2025 the factory was bought out with all of its debts by an investment company from Ivano-Frankivsk. Lviv City Council has repeatedly opposed plans of construction on the former enterprise's territory.

== Facilities ==
LAZ Holding had two factories located in Ukraine: LAZ and DAZ

LAZ headquarters and factory were in Lviv, Ukraine. This consisted of over 300 buildings. It was equipped with its own water pumping system, power transforming plant, gas filtration system, water cleaning and discharging system, machinery cooling system, centralized compressed air, fire house, police team, internal telephone/PA system, press building, laser cutting shop, chroming shop, metalworking shop, painting center, design bureau and a marketing center.

DAZ's headquarters consisted of 20 large buildings located in Kamianske. The DAZ factory plant had a large assembly hall, central compressed air system, welding and painting machinery and a testing center.

The central office for LAZ Holding was headquartered in Kyiv city center, Ukraine.

LAZ Holding consists of a few companies.

- Lviv Bus Factory "LAZ"
- Dnipro Bus Factory "DAZ"
- Mykolaiv Machine Plant "MMZ"
- LAZ finance company "LAZ Finance"
- LAZ sales "Torhovyi dim LAZ"
- LAZ Service and parts "LAZ Service"
- LAZ Holding central office "Office Kyiv"
- LAZ New York office "Office New York"
- Lemberg Coach Luxury buses "Lemberg Coach"

== Products ==
=== Buses ===
==== City buses ====
- LAZ-695 Lviv (1958–2002)
- LAZ-5252 (1992–2006)
- LAZ A183 CityLAZ-12 (2004–2012)

==== Articulated buses ====
- LAZ-6205 (1995–2000)
- LAZ-A291 (2001–2005)
- LAZ-A292 CityLAZ-20 (2007–2011)

==== Coach buses ====
- LAZ-697 Tourist (1959–1985)
- LAZ-5207 (1994–2002)
- LAZ-5207 Liner-12 (2003–2012)
- LAZ-52081 NeoLAZ-12 (2004–2010)

==== Intercity buses ====
- LAZ-699 Karpaty (1964–2002)
- LAZ-4207 (1984–2002)
- LAZ-A141 (1997–2000)
- LAZ A141 Liner-9 (2000–2012)
- LAZ-4207 Liner-10 (2003–2012)
- LAZ A191 InterLAZ-12LE (2007–2013)

==== Midibuses ====
- LAZ-4202 (1978–1995)
- LAZ-3202 (1994–1995)
- LAZ A073 (1998–1999)

=== Trolleybuses ===
- LAZ-695T Lviv (1963–1965)
- LAZ-52522 (1993–2006)
- LAZ E183 ElectroLAZ-12 (2005–2013)
- LAZ E301 ElectroLAZ-20 (2006–2013)

=== Electric cars ===
- NAMI-LAZ-750 (1951)

=== Trailers ===
- LAZ-712 (1954)
- LAZ-729 (1954)
- LAZ-742B (1956)
- 1-APM-3

=== Truck cranes ===
- AK-32 (1951, mounted on ZIS-150)
- LAZ-690 (1955–?, mounted on ZIS-150, ZIL-164, ZIL-164A)

=== Prototypes ===
- LAZ-695 (1956)
- LAZ-698 Karpaty (1960)
- LAZ Ukraina (1961)
- LAZ-696 (1966)
- LAZ-698T Karpaty (1967)
- LAZ Ukraina-67 (1967)
- LAZ-360 (1968)
- LAZ Ukraina-69 (1969)
- LAZ Ukraina-71 (1971)
- LAZ Ukraina-73 (1973)
- LAZ-5255 Karpaty (1980)
- LAZ-4206 (1986)
- LAZ-5257 (1993)
- LAZ-5208 (1994)
- LAZ-6206 (2000)
- LAZ AX183D AeroLAZ (2005)
- LAZ-E291 (2006)
- LAZ A152 CityLAZ-10LE (2007)
- LAZ-4207 NeoLAZ-10 (2012)
- LAZ A141 Liner (2012)

== See also ==
- SC Skify Lviv
