= LAZ-699 =

Soviet/Ukrainian two-axle urban/suburban bus

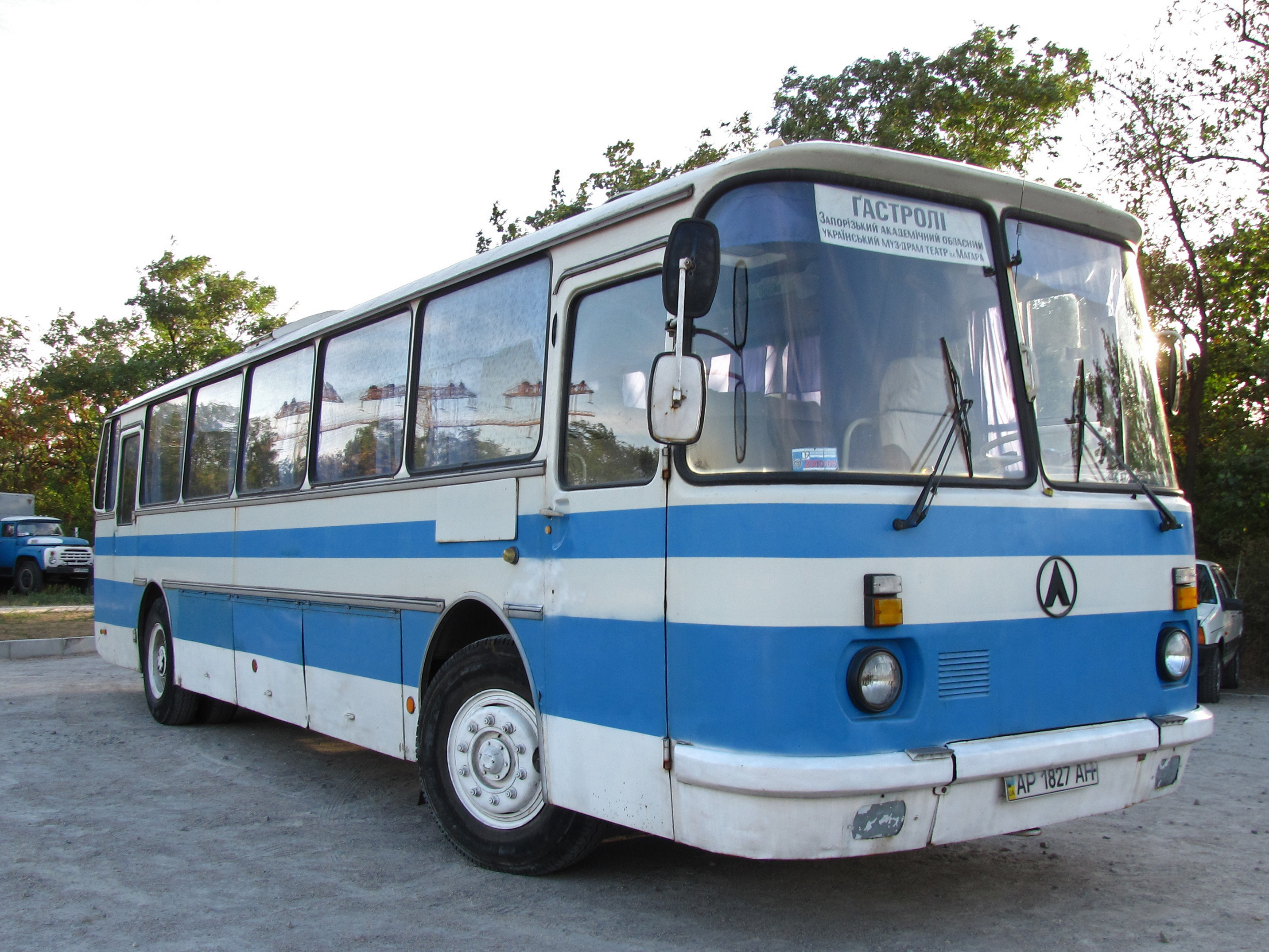
- A LAZ-699R in Ukraine

Overview
- Type: Coach, tourist bus
- Manufacturer: LAZ, Ukrainian Soviet Socialist Republic, Ukraine
- Production: 1961–2002
- Model years: LAZ-699A: 1960–1966; LAZ-699N: 1969–1978; LAZ-699R: 1978–2002
- Assembly: Lviv, Ukrainian Soviet Socialist Republic, Ukraine

Body and chassis
- Layout: Rear-engine, rear-wheel-drive layout
- Platform: 4x2 chassis
- Related: LAZ-695, LAZ-697

Powertrain
- Engine: LAZ-699A: 7 L ZiL-375 V8 (gasoline), 180 hp; LAZ-699R: 7 L ZiL-375Ya5 V8 (gasoline), 180 hp; LAZ-699R: 11,2 L YAMZ-236A V6 (diesel), 195 hp
- Transmission: Manual 5-step transmission with synchronizer on gears II, III, IV and V; gear ratio: I-6,17; II-3,40; III-1,79; IV-1,00; V-0,78; reverse gear-6,69

Dimensions
- Wheelbase: LAZ-699A: 5,535 mm (217.9 in); LAZ-699R: 5,545 mm (218.3 in)
- Length: LAZ-699A: 10,565 mm (415.9 in); LAZ-699R: 10,540 mm (415.0 in)
- Width: LAZ-699A: 2,500 mm (98.4 in); LAZ-699R: 2,500 mm (98.4 in)
- Height: LAZ-699A: 2,990 mm (117.7 in); LAZ-699R: 2,980 mm (117.3 in)
- Curb weight: LAZ-699A: 7,660 kg (16,887 lb); LAZ-699R: 8,896 kg (19,612 lb)

The LAZ-699 is a Soviet intercity bus which was built in the Ukrainian city of Lviv between 1964 and 2002. It was modeled on the LAZ-697 and lengthened by one section as a luxury vehicle and, later, transport for astronauts on the Baikonur Cosmodrome. A number of prototypes were produced before mass production began in 1985, coinciding with the cancellation of the LAZ-697.

== History ==
In December 1961, the Lviv Bus Factory introduced a bus prototype nicknamed "Carpathian" which was modeled on the middle-class coach LAZ-697. The new bus was lengthened by one section, and was designed to provide more amenities and greater comfort to passengers on intercity and international bus routes.

The LAZ-699 Carpathian had 36 adjustable seats equipped with earphones, lights, ashtrays, glass holders, folding tables, and storage nets, a toilet and wardrobe in the rear, and a buffet, thermos compartment, and refrigerator in the front. The interior was illuminated by lamps, and had two sliding roof hatches for air circulation. The bus had two heating systems: an engine-dependent heater which transferred heat from the engine into the interior, and a vented heater which was independent of the engine. Its under-floor luggage space had a capacity of 4.5 cubic metres (160 cu ft). Each passenger was allowed 20 kilograms (44 lb) of luggage.

The prototype's body was strengthened to compensate for its increased length. Its power unit was a YAMZ ZiL-375 and the 180-horsepower engine, installed in the rear, was sealed to make the interior soundproof. The bus had pneumatic wheel suspension, power steering, and a brake system with a pneumatic booster and a separate brake drive. A second fuel tank increased the bus's range, and its maximum speed was 97 kilometres per hour (60 mph). The prototype was brought to Moscow in 1961, where it was shown to the public (including Soviet Premier Nikita Khrushchev).

External images
- LAZ-699 prototypes
- First LAZ-699 Carpathian prototype
- Nikita Khrushchev inspects the interior of the first LAZ-699 prototype, 1961
- LAZ-699A Carpathian-2 (second prototype)
- Third Carpathian prototype, first version
- Third prototype, second version
- Third prototype, second version, from the rear
- Fourth prototype
- Fifth, pre-series prototype

The second Carpathian prototype was the simplified LAZ-699A. To increase capacity, its wardrobe, toilet, buffet, ashtrays, folding tables, and glass holders were removed; its adjustable seatbacks were removed. These modifications increased the bus's seating from 36 to 41. Two additional adjustable seats could be installed in the front, bringing its seating up to 43. The technically-difficult pneumatic suspension was replaced by a leaf spring with a correction spring. For the LAZ-699A prototype, the YAMZ-200 5-step transmission was equipped with an electro-hydraulic gear shift and a pneumatic clutch drive. Externally, the only difference from the first prototype was an additional set of headlights below the main pair.

In 1961 and 1962, new prototypes of both Carpathian models were produced. Both buses now had four headlights, installed in a horizontal line. The diameter of each headlight was reduced. The electro-hydraulic gear shift was replaced with a mechanical system. The ZiL-130 power-steering system and axle transmission were replaced by a steering system from the older ZiL-164 truck. Unlike the earlier prototypes, the new buses now had round rear-wheel arches and split direction indicators similar to the urban LAZ-695.

Acceptance tests were carried out on the Crimean peninsula, with the intent of entering production with the new models. The tests, however, indicated a number of problems. The ZiL-164 axles failed quickly, and the hydro-pneumatic drum brakes (also borrowed from the ZiL-164) were unreliable. The compressor's power output was insufficient for the pneumatic suspension system. Its lack of power steering made it difficult for drivers to control the bus, especially on dirt roads. Other problems included an unreliable frame, windows with a tendency to fall out, a leaky roof and engine compartment, and unacceptably high fuel consumption. Production was postponed until 1964, when the weaknesses identified by the tests were corrected.

In 1963, another LAZ-699A prototype was released with more reliable axles from the new MAZ-500 truck. The bus was unchanged externally, and was the last model with four headlights. In the fifth and final Carpathian prototype, the four headlights were reduced to two and the front-wheel arches were rounded to match the rear wheels.

== Production ==
=== 699A Tourist (1964–1966) ===
The production model of the LAZ-699A was nicknamed "Tourist" like its predecessor, the LAZ-697. It had two roof types: a conventional all-metal roof with three ventilation hatches, and a soft-top version with three tarpaulin hatches for use in warm climates. The body extension which had resulted in poor frame rigidity during prototype development was never fixed, and production of this model was discontinued in 1964 after few buses were produced.

External images
- LAZ-699A Tourist and Lux
- LAZ-699A Tourist
- Interior of the 699A Tourist
- LAZ-699A Lux
- The 699A Lux from the rear

=== 699A Lux (1967) ===
The LAZ-699A "Lux" was produced in the spring of 1967 for an international bus contest in Nice. As its name implied, this model was designed to provide more comfort than the earlier LAZ-699A. The buffet, toilet, and wardrobe from the first Carpathian prototype were restored; fog lights and indicator lights were installed on the front bumper, along with metal hubcaps and mouldings over the wheel arches.

The bus's entry in the contest was the Soviet Union's first. The Lux and another LAZ model, Ukraine-67, participated with models from other manufacturers such as the ZiL-118 "Youth" and the PAZ-665T. The LAZ buses received a number of awards from the French tourism commission.

The Lux, the final 699A model, was built only once. Too expensive for the Soviet market, it was followed by the LAZ-699N.

=== 699N (1969–1978) ===
Although production of the 699A Tourist ended in 1966, LAZ's development of an intercity bus continued. During the 1960s, the bus's design evolved from round, borderless forms and sloping roofs to clearly bordered and edged body parts.

External images
- 699N series
- First 699N "Tourist-2" prototype
- First Tourist-2 prototype, from the rear
- Second 699N Tourist-2 prototype
- Third 699N "Ukraina" prototype
- Production LAZ-699N
- Restored 699N Ukraina
- 699ND prototype
- 699B
- Ukraina 71
- Ukraina 73

After the introduction of the N-models of the LAZ-695 and LAZ-697, the new design was transferred to the 699. The 699N line received a reinforced front axle and power steering from the heavy-duty MAZ-500 truck, a rear axle from Raba, and a modified ZiL-375Ya5 engine. The Raba axles had a planetary transmission in the wheel hubs and a larger brake-pad area, which reduced braking distance. The brakes were given a separate drive unit to ensure safe braking even when one of the pneumatic lines failed.

This prototype, released in 1969, was called the LAZ-699N "Tourist-2". The front of the new body was flatter, and the rear section resembled the LAZ-695M. Removal of the sloped roof led to better body rigidity and allowed the installation of larger windows, which improved passive cooling of the passenger cabin. A rear door was added, which became required attribute on future LAZ-699 models. The number of seats remained the same (41), and the luggage compartment expanded to 4.38 cubic metres (155 cu ft). A leaf-spring suspension was used on all axles.

Another prototype of the N-model, released in 1973, was nicknamed "Ukraine" and was produced for only two years. Between 1976 and 1978, only a few buses of that model were built. One 699N Ukraine was restored by enthusiasts from Kyiv.

=== 699B (1969) ===
The LAZ-699B was an attempt to create a high-capacity city bus on an extended LAZ-695N base. It had a 180-horsepower ZiL-375 engine, with reinforced axles and body construction. An automatic transmission and a pneumatic spring suspension were added. The 31-seat bus could accommodate 74 passengers. A mid-body four-section flap door from the LiAZ-677 was installed, along with an accumulation platform. The LiAZ-677, with its capacity of 110 passengers, negated the need for a bus like the LAZ-699B; only one was built, by the All-Union Experimental Construction Institute in Lviv. A 1972 experimental prototype equipped with a hybrid propulsion system, a ZMZ-53 petrol engine with a DK-512A traction generator, accumulators, and DK-308A traction motors achieved a power of 75 kilowatts.

=== LAZ Ukraine-71 (1971) ===
During the early 1970s, a luxury bus with the newest technology was released every two years and called "Ukraine". The LAZ Ukraine-71 was produced in two models. Its design was less futuristic than its predecessors, Ukraine-67 and Ukraine-69, and resembled the LAZ-699N prototypes. The interior was equipped with two televisions, radio systems, a buffet, a toilet, a refrigerator, a coffee machine, and a gas stove. Every seat could be tilted and moved sideways, and was equipped with individual lighting and ventilation. The bus had a modified 375-horsepower ZiL-375Ya5 engine, a hydraulic clutch booster, a two-section brake system, and a pneumatic telescopic suspension.

=== Ukraine-73 (1973) ===
In 1973, a more comfortable version was produced with a raised passenger-section floor. Other new features included a climate-control system and an automatic, electric two-section entry door which opened outwards. Designers planned to install a new diesel engine, the YAMZ-740 (a prototype of the future engine for KAMAZ trucks), but LAZ did not receive it in time. A new five-step transmission, the YAMZ-204U, was used.

=== 699ND prototype (1974) ===
A 1974 prototype was equipped with the 210-horsepower diesel YAMZ-740, the engine intended for the Ukraine-73, and was shown to the public at the 50 Years of Avtoprom exhibition in Moscow. Later given the suffix ND with the intent of beginning production in 1979, the bus was never produced.

=== 699P (1973–1974) ===
The LAZ-699P was based on the luxury 699N models Ukraine-71 and Ukraine-73. Replacing the version of the LAZ-695M for astronauts, it was created in time for the joint Soviet-U.S. Apollo–Soyuz space mission; long-term missions to space stations were planned to begin in the mid-1970s. Sanitary and epidemiological demands were increased, as well as increased demands for spacesuit protection after the Soyuz 11 disaster. The modification for the astronauts was developed at LAZ's Bus Technology Research Institute in 1973.

Its interior was hermetically sealed, and the windows were double-glazed and athermal. A Freeturbo BM-15 air-conditioning system from the German manufacturer Anton Kaiser was installed. The bus had three compartments; the front compartment was for the driver and commander. Passenger compartment one, behind the driver's section, took about half the length of the bus and was for the astronauts and their doctors. Three large, comfortable, rotatable astronaut seats were installed on the left side, matching the future Soyuz-T spacecraft for its three-person crew. On the right were three seats for the doctors. Special ventilation units were in that section of the bus for the Sokol space suits. Passenger compartment two included nine comfortable seats, a toilet, buffet, refrigerator and wardrobe for accompanying personnel, who were banned for epidemiological reasons from contact with the astronauts. The rear door was in the middle section and led into a lock chamber, where a vacuum cleaner sucked dust off the spacesuits. The bus was equipped with an adjustable air suspension system. To protect the interior's electronic devices, the engine electronics were shielded. Other features were a radio, cassette and videocassette players, a television system, and an internal communication system.

External images
- LAZ 699P and LAZ 699I
- Second LAZ-699P
- The LAZ-699P during assembly
- Driver's compartment
- Middle and rear compartments
- Transport of the first LAZ-699P to Baikonur by Antonov An-22
- LAZ-699I

The bus was handed over to the Soviet Air Forces on May 16, 1974, in Lviv, and was transported by an Antonov An-22. On July 3, it was first used to transport the crew of Soyuz 14 to their spacecraft. A second LAZ-699P was produced one year later for the Apollo–Soyuz space mission. The first 699P brought the main crews to the rocket sites in 1974 and 1975, and the backup crews between 1975 and 1991; both buses were later replaced by new LAZ-5255 "Carpathians", the successor of the LAZ-699. The second LAZ-699P was brought to Star City, where it burned down years later. The first bus served at the Baikonur Cosmodrome until 2003.

=== 699I (1974–1975) ===
In 1974 and 1975, another version of the LAZ-699N was designed for the Baikonur Cosmodrome. The LAZ-699I was intended to be a mobile service point to support rocket launches. The bus was equipped with two separate cooling and power-supply systems and a standard fluid cooling system. The power supply was a 12V onboard network and a 1.2 kW power generator. In stationary operation, the bus was heated and cooled by an electrical system consisting of 12 LN-1 heater fans.

The bus was divided into three sections. Compartment one was at the rear. On the left were three workplaces with microphones. Four seats for eight people, an air-conditioner remote control, a refrigerator and a wardrobe were installed. The second section, between the two main compartments, included one seat, a wardrobe and a vacuum-cleaner cupboard; the vacuum cleaner removed dust from space suits. The third compartment, behind the driver, had eight seats, a wardrobe and a large table. Each compartment had its own entry door leading to the hermetically-sealed interior; unlike the LAZ-699P, the door placement was similar to the LAZ-699N. Two buses were built, which served the cosmodrome until 2003.

=== 699R (1978–2002) ===
The LAZ-699R replaced the LAZ-699N in 1978. In 1983, when production of the middle-class coach LAZ-697 was curtailed, mass production of the LAZ-699 began. In 1985, the LAZ-697 was replaced by the 699. In more than 20 years of production, the model underwent a number of modifications but the main parts and body design remained the same. The interior still had 41 reclining seats with individual lighting and ventilation. The buses had rectangular headlights until 1981; early models had a false radiator screen, which was removed at the end of the 1980s. A luxury version for senior government institutions existed in the first half of the decade. Typical of this model were decorative black plastic parts such as hubcaps, a false radiator screen and air intake, and a front bumper with fog lights. The driver entry door was eliminated in 1990.

Originally designed for long-distance service, the bus was used on shorter intercity and suburban routes because of its obsolete construction; more comfortable, economical, diesel-powered coaches such as the Hungarian Ikarus 256 and Ikarus 250 existed in the Soviet Union. The bus had some advantages, however; due to its simple construction, it was reliable on the hard dirt roads typical of the Soviet Union.

LAZ-699R

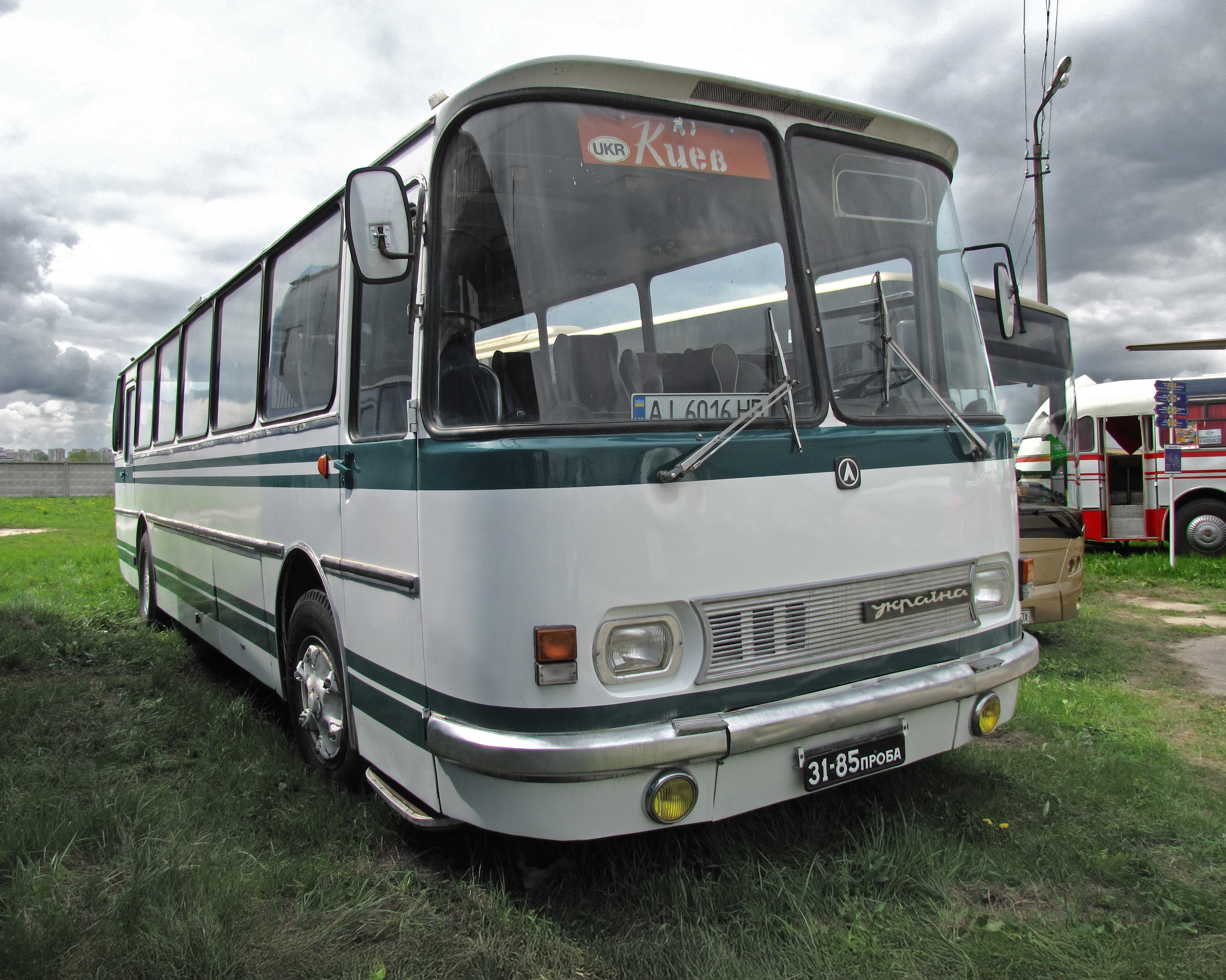
The early version of the LAZ-699, with a false radiator grille on the front and driver's-side door

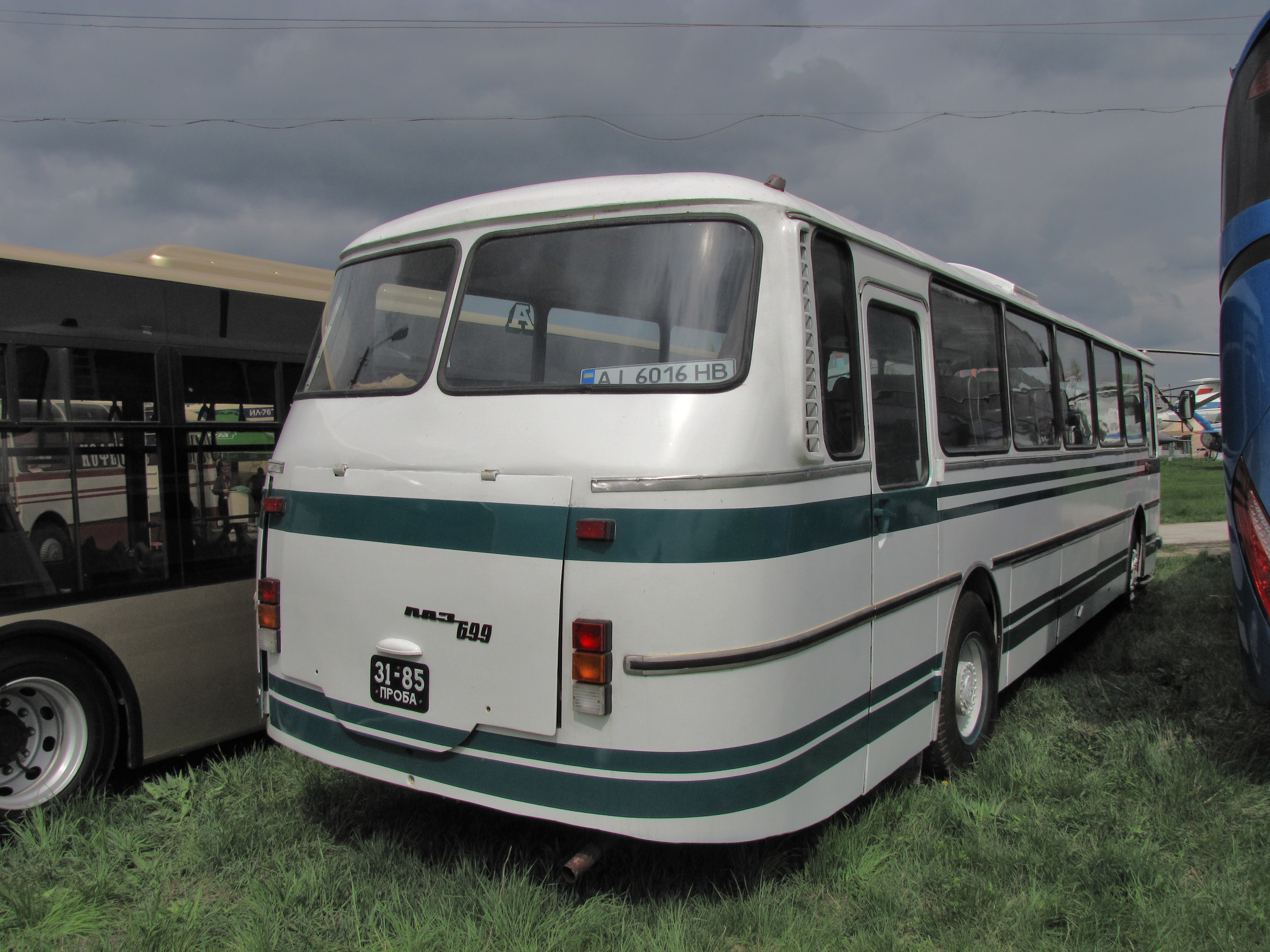
The early version of the LAZ-699

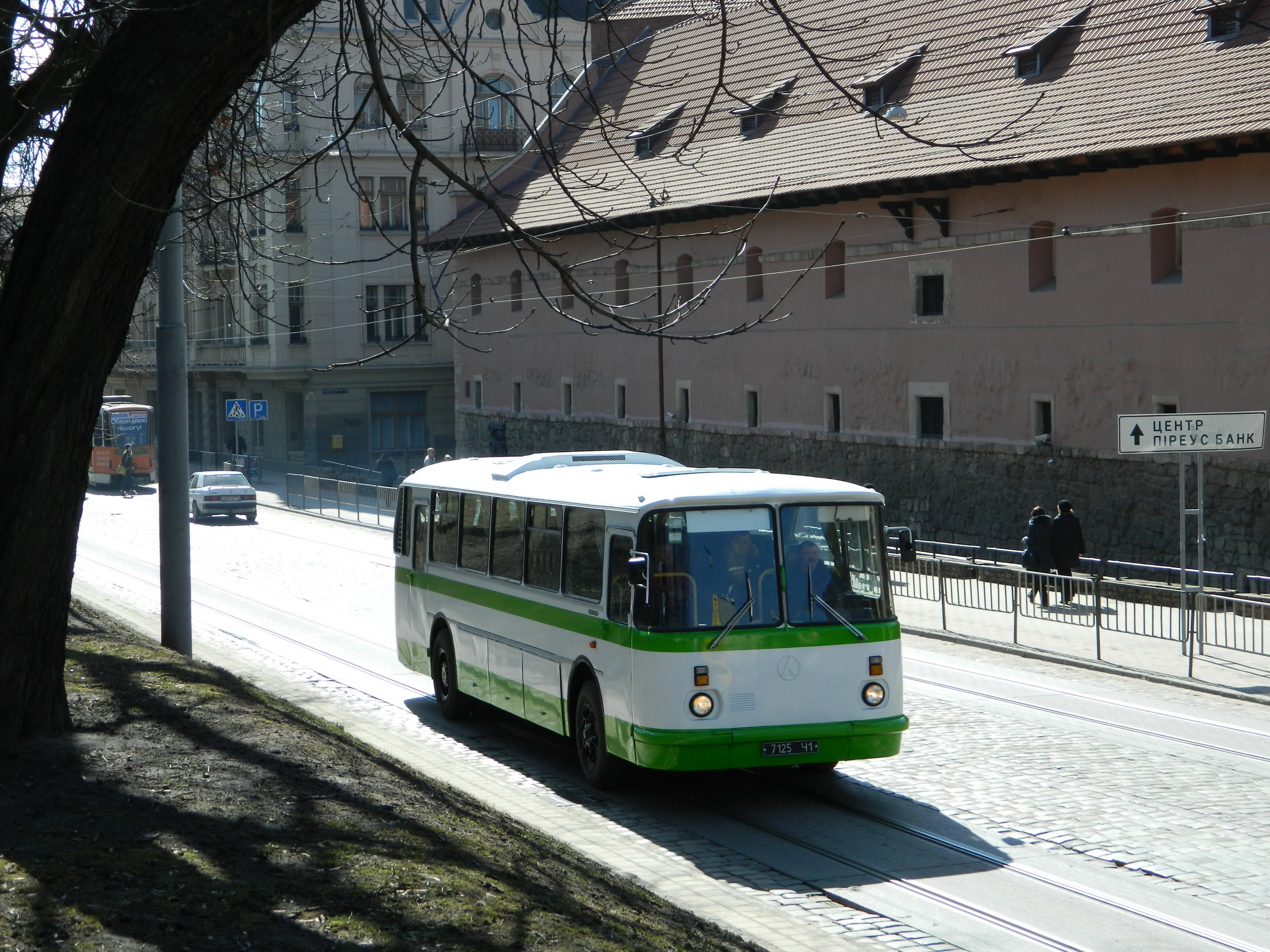
Last version of the LAZ-699R, without the false radiator grille

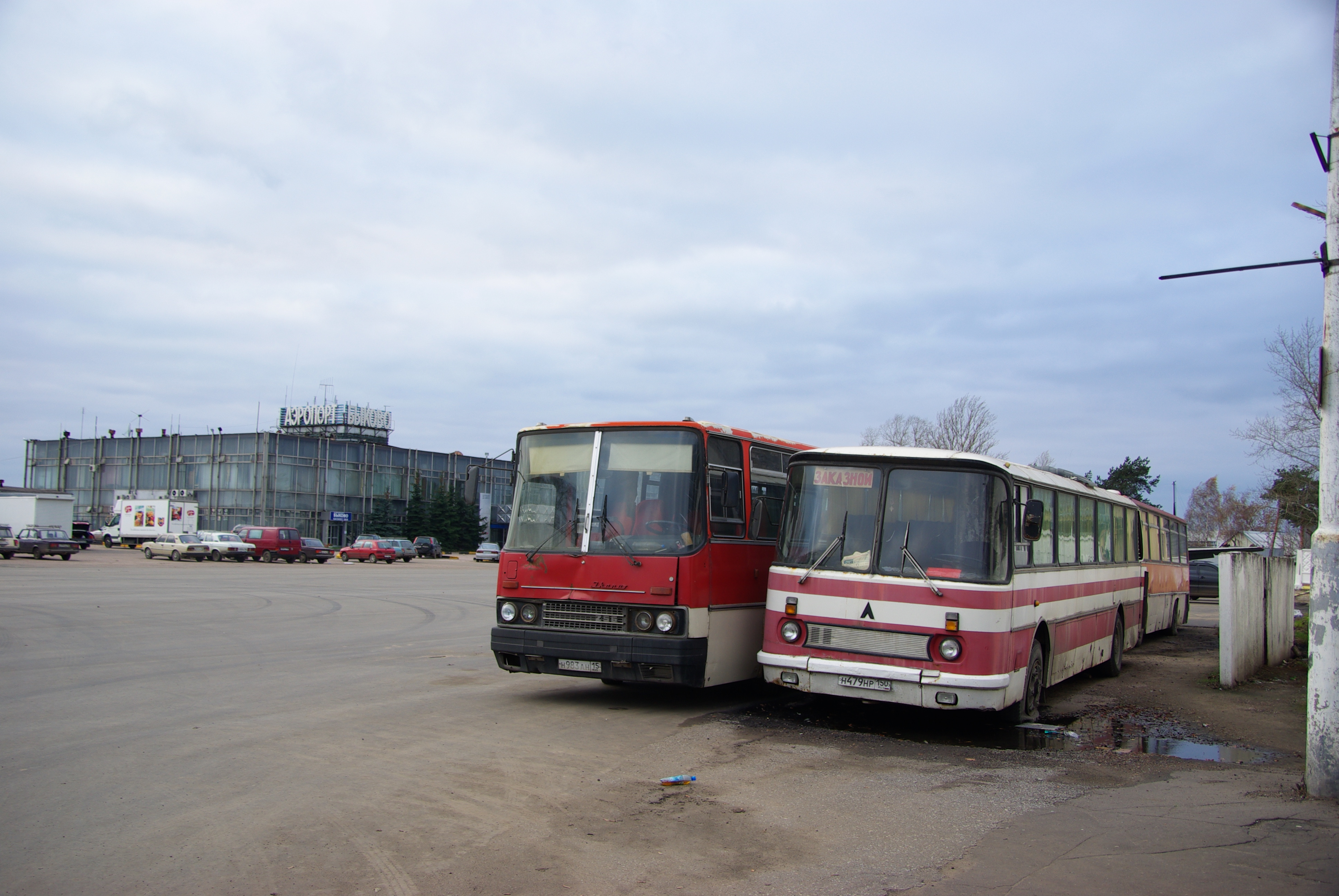
The LAZ-699R compared to its main counterpart in the Soviet Union, the Hungarian Ikarus 256

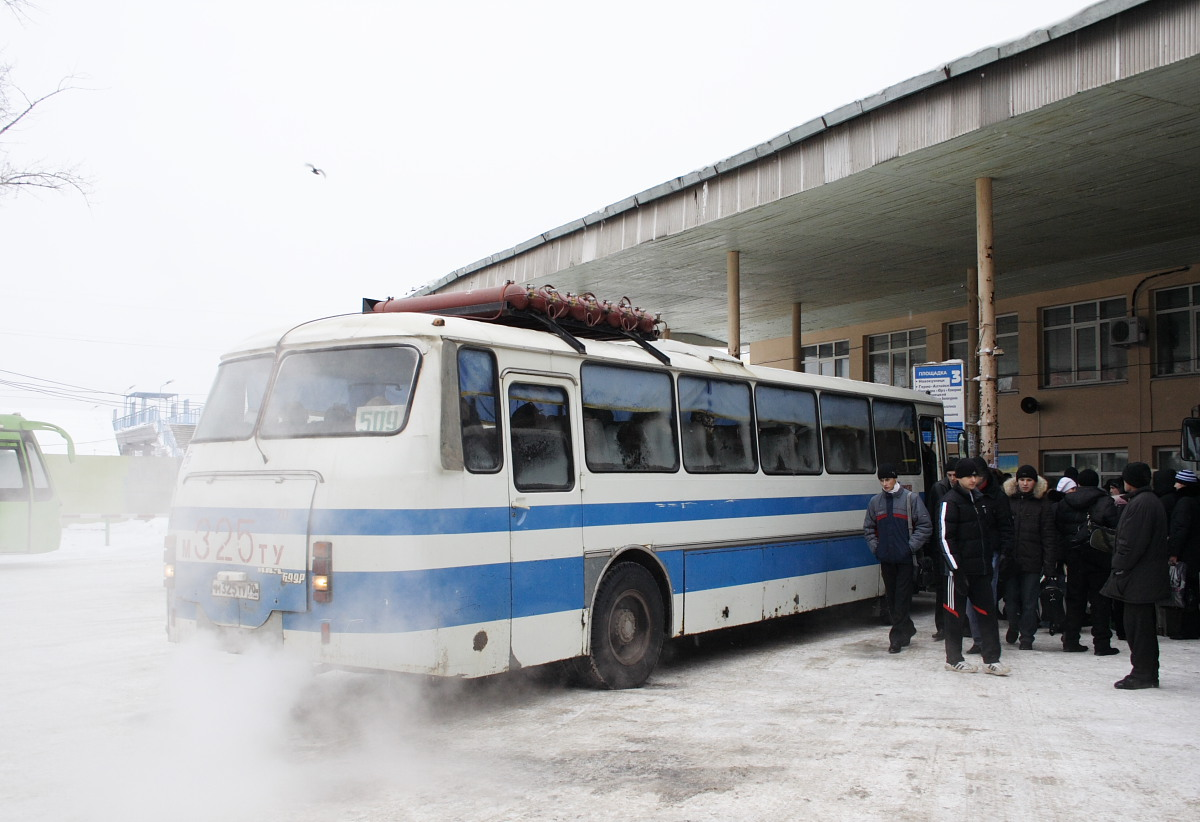
A gas-powered LAZ-699R in Russia

After the dissolution of the Soviet Union and the associated increase in fuel prices, the petrol-powered ZIL-375 engine originally intended for the military all-wheel-drive Ural-375 truck became obsolete. Bus operators began to customize their engines with gas systems or install diesel engines like the YAMZ-236 from the MAZ trucks. Compared to the original ZIL engine, the YAMZ-236 is a half-tonne heavier and (without a turbocharger) has nearly the same power: 195 hp. The diesel engine has better traction, with a higher torque of 716 Nm (ZIL-375: 475 Nm) which is reached at the lower 1400 rpm. The fuel consumption of an LAZ with such an engine decreased from 40 to 27 litres of cheaper diesel fuel. However, replacing the engine also required the installation of a suitable gearbox.

Research by the manufacturer was done only on the LAZ-695 series, and the first choice was the D-245.9 from Belarusian manufacturer MMZ. The YAMZ-236 was also installed later. The LAZ-699 was equipped with the YAMZ-236A diesel engine.

=== 699 Carpathian (1978) ===
External images
- LAZ-699 Carpathian
- LAZ-699 Carpathian
- Further development, LAZ-5255P

One version of the LAZ-699 Carpathian was produced by the All-Union Experimental Bus Construction Institute in Lviv. The bus was completely new, externally and internally, and design elements and technical solutions were integrated into the LAZ-699R. The bus served the astronaut training centre in Moscow for many years, and was then further developed as the 5255P.

== Comparison ==
	LAZ-695N	LAZ-697R	LAZ-699R
Picture			
Years of serial production	1976–2010	1978–1985	1978–2002
Dimensions [mm]
Wheelbase	4190	4200	5545
Length	9190	9195	10540
Width	2500		
Height	2950	2980	
Engine data
Model	ZiL-130Ya2		ZiL-375Ya5
Type	gasoline powered, V8		
Volume [l]	6		7
Compression ratio	6.5		
Maximal power [hp] ([kW])	150 (110.3) at 3200 rpm		180 (132.4) at 3200 rpm
Maximal torque [Nm]	402 at 1800–2000 rpm		465.8 at 1800 rpm
bore*stroke [mm^{2}]	100*95		108*95
Transmission
Number of gears	5		
Synchronization	on gear II, III, IV, V		
Gear ratio	I-7.44; II-4.10; III-2.29; IV-1.47; V-1.00; Reverse gear-7.09		I-6.17; II-3.40; III-1.79; IV-1.00; V-0.78; Reverse gear-6.69
Final gear	Centralized, one-step and planetary transmission in wheel hubs		
Ratio of final gear: Central gear/Wheel hub transmission/Total	1.93/ 3.90/ 7.52	1.79/ 3.90/ 6.98	1.93/ 3.90/ 7.52
Weight data [kg]
Empty Weight	6850	7550	8896
Load on the front / rear axle	2200/ 4650	2450/ 5100	3273/ 5623
Maximal permissible weight	11610	10880	12998
Permissible load on the front / rear axle	4085/ 7525	3770/ 7110	4548/ 8450
Weight of engine with clutch	620		640
Transmission weight	120		216
Drive shaft weight	16		30
Front axle weight	304		398
Rear axle weight	665		720
Body weight	3080	3405	4610
Wheel weight/ Weight of all wheels	110/ 660		
Radiator weight	35		
Other data
Number of seats	34	33	41
Maximum speed [km/h]	80	85	102
Fuel consumption [l/100 km]	35		41
Braking distance at 60 km per hour [m]	32.1		
Maximum turning radius of the external front wheel [m]	8.5		11.2
